= Organization of Kita and Minami Fortresses =

The Kita and Minami Fortresses (Japanese kita, "north" and minami, "south") were defensive structures of the Imperial Japanese Army and Imperial Japanese Navy in the Kuril Archipelago.

The most northerly points were on the Kokutan and Kurabu Zaki capes, and its coastal front on the Shumushu Strait near Lopatka Cape in the Soviet Union's Kamchatka peninsula.

This military organization was under the Twenty-Seventh Army (Chishima Area Base Unit or Kuril Area Army), led by Shozo Terakura. The Twenty-seventh Army was under the leadership of the Fifth Area Army, under the command of Kiichiro Higuchi whose headquarters was in Sapporo, Hokkaidō. The Twenty-Seventh Army was composed of the 42nd and 91st Divisions.

== Kurile fortresses ==
These defensive structures in the Kurile Islands were somewhat similar to the Karafuto fortifications. The key Japanese position was on Shumushu Island, whose defense consisted of permanent emplacements protected by field and AA artillery. A garrison of over 8,000 men reinforced by 60 tanks defended the islands of Shumushu and Paramushiro. All the coastal sections convenient for landings were covered with permanent emplacements and bunkers, interconnected with underground passages and trenches. All the warehouses, power stations and hospitals were underground, up to 50 m deep.

There are also some similar military buildings in other islands in the Northern Kuriles (Shimushiro, Onnekotan, Uruppu, Matsuwa) and Southern Kuriles (Etorofu, Kunashiri, Shikotan and Habomai archipelago).

== Kita Chishima Fortress ==
=== Shumushu Island ===
==== Shumushu fortification system ====
There were nine fortified installations and 20 coastal defence positions commanded from Kataoka Fortress.

==== Japanese Army units ====
- 91st division
  - 73rd Infantry Brigade (part of 91st division under command of Maj. Gen. Iwao Zugino)
    - 282nd Battalion
    - 283rd Battalion
    - 284th Battalion
    - 285th Battalion
    - 286th Battalion
    - 287th Battalion
  - 11th armored regiment - Commanded by Colonel Zueo Ikeda, the regiment was equipped with 20 Type 97 Shinhoto Chi-Ha tanks, 19 Type 97 Chi-Ha medium tanks, and 25 Type 95 Ha-Go light tanks.
  - 2. Independent armored company
- 1st Artillery Unit
- 2nd Artillery Unit
- I/54th Air Regiment (4 Nakajima Ki-43 Hayabusa "Oscar", some Nakajima Ki-44 Shoki "Tojo" and possibly Nakajima Ki-84 Hayate "Frank"), based in Miyoshino Airfield, Shumushu.
- Shumushu Alert Radar: located at Minami Cape and cannery on the Naka River

=== Paramushiro Island ===
==== Paramushiro fortification system ====
There are less than two or possibly more fortifications and 6 or more coastal defensive positions commanded from Kashibawara Fortress.

==== Japanese Army units ====
- 91st Division HQ (Lt. Gen. Tsutsumi Fusaki)
  - 74th Infantry Brigade (Major Zeiji Zato)
  - 4th Tank Company (detachment of 11th Tank Regiment)
- II/54th Sentai (Ki-43 Oscars and Ki-44 Tojos)
- Kitanodai Airfield: airfield located on the north-east tip of the island with a single 4,000' x 180° runway. The base had 40 revetments and over 50 hardstands.
- Kashiwabara Airfield: located at the north-eastern tip of the island, closest to Shumshu Island. Japanese Army Staging area in the north.heavily defended by 20 anti-aircraft positions
- Kakumabetsu Airfield: airfield located in the south-west side of the island with a 3,800' x 150' runway. Ki-44 Tojo operated from this strip.
- Suribachi Airbase: annex airfield located at the center of the south coast of the island, with two runways.

=== Japanese Navy units on Shumushu and Paramushiro ===
- 51st Guard Unit (942 men)
- 52nd Guard Unit (333 men)
- Shumushu Signal Unit (42 men)
- 32nd AA Defense Unit (18 men)
- Kita Chishima Naval HQ
- North East Fleet (Kashibawara and Kataoka Bases)
- North East Unit (189 men/4 Nakajima B5N2 "Kate" and probably Aichi D3A2 "Val" or Yokosuka D4Y2 "Judy" dive bombers)
- 12th Air Fleet Unit (equipped with Kawanishi H6K2 "Mavis" and Mitsubishi G4M2 "Betty")
- Shimushu Detachment, Naval Air Group 203 (with Mitsubishi A6M5 "Zeke" and Nakajima J1N1-S "Irving" night fighter)
- Hokuto Kōkūtai (553rd Kōkūtai) - B5N Kate & B6N Jill
- 203rd Kōkūtai (A6M, J1N1)
- Musashi Naval Base (Musashi Airfield): Located on the south-western tip of Paramushiro island was this naval base and airfield located at Karabu Zaki. The runways were 4,300' x 260' and 4,200' x 375'. Anti-aircraft guns were added at the nearby cape with 8 guns, 20 pillboxes and many gun pits.
- Miyoshino Airfield Japanese Army-Navy airfield, located near the center of the Shumushu island. This airfield based several units including a B5N2 Kate, G3M Nell and Ki-43 Oscar based there.
- Kataoka Naval Base (Imaizaki Airfield):This base had two runways 5,000' x 250' and 4,000' x 250'. The base had a large 130' x 165' hangar with 13 covered revetments and 34 uncovered revetments, three 60' oil storage tanks, and other barracks and supply buildings. The base also had a seaplane facility on the harbor, allowing H6K2 Mavis flying boats to operate at the base as headquarters of the 5th Fleet.

Such units were sometimes reinforced by seaplane tender Kimikawa Maru (with the 452nd Air Fleet aboard, equipped with Nakajima A6M2-N "Rufe" Hydro fighters).

There was also a Japanese air early warning radar of unspecified type on the southern cape of Paramushiro, Kurabu Zaki, but its view of Shumushu was likely blocked by the 5958-foot volcano (apparently named Suribachi, like the one on Iwo Jima) in the center of Paramushiro.

=== Shimushiro Island ===
==== Shimushiro fortification system ====
There are less than 2 or possibly more fortifications and 6 or more coastal defensive positions commanded from Itarkioi and Ketoebone Fortresses.

==== Japanese Army units ====
- 42nd Division (Itarkioi and Ketoebone detachments) at Simushir island.

=== Matsuwa Island ===
- 41st Independent Mixed Regiment (Colonel Ueda)
- 6th Independent Tank Company
- Matsuwa Army Field Battalion
- Matsuwa Air Intelligence Unit
- 102nd Hikōtai, 553rd Kōkūtai (air naval unit equipped D3A2 type 99 model 22)
- Possible east-west airstrip on southern area of island, upwards of 1.33 km maximum length

=== Uruppu Island ===
6000 troops were based on Uruppu, including:

- 129th Independent Mixed Brigade (Maj. Niho)
- 53rd Anchorange Unit
- 6th Disembarkation Unit (800 men)
- 80th Airfield Battalion
- Uruppu Air Intelligence Unit (800 men)
- 5th Independent Tank Company
- 23rd Independent AA Gun Company

=== Other North Kuriles units ===
Some units possibly existed in Shashukotan (Ootome Base) and Onnekotan (Torushiri Base).

== Minami Chishima Fortress ==
=== Etorofu Island ===
==== Etorofu fortification system ====
Defensive organization commanded from Rubetsu Fortress, was divided into:

Etorofu District:

- Shibetoro County
  - Shibetoro Fortress
- Shana County
  - Shana Fortress
  - Bettobu Fortress
- Rubetsu or Etorofu County
  - Toshimoe Fortress
  - Rubetsu Fortress
  - Tennel Fortress
  - Naibo Fortress
  - Riyaushi Fortress
  - Tanemoe Fortress

==== Japanese Army units ====
- 89th Division
  - 3rd Mixed Brigade
- 15th Independent Mortar Battalion
- 6th Independent Machine Gun Battalion
- 67th Independent Field Machine Cannon Company
- 23rd Independent Field AA Gun Company
- 13th Independent Antitank Gun Company
- 6th Shipping Engineer Regiment
- Etorofu Air Intelligence Unit
- 3rd Attack Air Combat regiment (equipped with Ki-48-Ib and Ki-48-IIa Bombers)
- Hokushintai Sentai (Army Anti Submarine Warfare Squadron) (equipped with Ki-45-Tei is KMX-MAD (Magnetic Anomaly Detector))based in Tenneru Army Airfield, Etorofu Island.

=== Shikotan Island ===
- 4th Mixed Brigade (part of 89th division)
- 23rd Independent Machine Gun Battalion
- 1st Mortar Company/15th Independent Mortar Battalion

=== Kunashiri Island ===
- 421st Battalion (part of 4th Mixed Brigade belonging to 89th division)
- 23rd Special Guards Company

=== Other South Kuril units ===
There were probably other detached units in Habomai Archipelago (Kaigara Group, Suisho, Akiyuri, Yuri, Shibotsu and Taraku island).

== See also ==
- Battle of Shumshu
