= Soviet invasion of the Kuril Islands =

1945 Soviet invasion of the Japanese-owned Kuril Islands

- Part of the Soviet–Japanese War
- Map of the invasion of the Kuril Islands
Date	18 August – 2 September 1945
Location	Chishima Province, Japan (now Kuril Islands, Russia)
Result	Soviet victory
Territorial changes	Kuril Islands annexed to the Soviet Union

Belligerents
Soviet Union	Empire of Japan

Commanders and leaders
(Soviet Union) Aleksandr Ksenofontov (Soviet Union) Aleksei Gnechko (Soviet Union) Dmitry Ponomarev	(Empire of Japan) Fusaki Tsutsumi (surrendered)

Strength
15,000 troops	80,000 troops

Casualties and losses
at least 962 killed at least 1,026 wounded	at least 1,018 killed or wounded 50,422 surrendered

The Soviet Union captured the Kuril Islands from Japan in 1945 during World War II. The invasion, part of the Soviet–Japanese War, was decided on when plans to land on Hokkaido were abandoned. The successful military operations of the Red Army at Mutanchiang and during the invasion of South Sakhalin created the necessary prerequisites for invasion of the Kuril Islands.

== Order of battle ==
Soviet Union

- 2nd Far Eastern Front
  - 87th Rifle Corps
    - 355th Rifle Division
    - 113th Separate Rifle Brigade
  - 56th Rifle Corps
    - 2nd Rifle Brigade
  - Kamchatka Defense Area
    - 101st Rifle Division
    - Separate Rifle Regiment
    - 128th Composite Air Division (78 aircraft)
- Soviet Pacific Fleet (operating from Petropavlosk naval base)
  - 60 ships and vessels including transports
  - 2nd Independent Naval Aviation Bomber Regiment
  - Coastal Artillery battery
  - 365th Marine Battalion
- 60th Border Guards Detachment

Imperial Japan

- Army:
- 5th IJA Area Army
  - IJA 27th Army
    - 91st Infantry Division
      - 73rd Infantry Brigade
      - 74th Infantry Brigade
      - 11th Tank Regiment
    - 89th Infantry Division
    - 31st Air Defence Regiment (Shumshu)
    - 41st Mixed Regiment
    - 129th Infantry Brigade
- Navy:
- IJN Marines
  - No 51 and No. 52 Guard Unit, and Shumshu Communications Unit from 12th Air Fleet

== Battle ==
The operation took place between the 18th of August and 1st of September. The attack was made by the 87th Rifle Corps (Guards Lieutenant General A. S. Ksenofontov) of the 16th Army (Lieutenant General Leonty Cheremisov) from the 2nd Far Eastern Front, and elements of the Kamchatka Defense Area (Major General Alexey Gnechko commanding). Ships and transportation were drawn from the Petropavlovsk military base (Captain Dmitry Ponomarev). The 128th Aviation Division also provided support.

The islands were occupied by the Japanese 91st Infantry Division (Shiashkotan, Paramushir, Shumshu, and Onekotan), 42nd Division (Simushir), 41st Independent Regiment (Matua), 129th Independent Brigade (Urup), and 89th Infantry Division (Iturup and Kunashir). The Japanese commander was Lieutenant General Fusaki Tsutsumi.

Initial reconnaissance was undertaken on the 18th of August by a detachment of the 113th Separate Rifle Brigade (Captain-Lieutenant G. I. Brunshtein), carried by two mine trawlers (ТЩ-589 and ТЩ-590) to Rubetzu Bay on Iturup island. The landings on Iturup were continued by the 355th Rifle Division, which also landed on the smaller island of Urup.

On the 23rd of August, the 20,000-strong Japanese garrisons on the islands were ordered to surrender as part of the general surrender of Japan. However, some of the garrison forces ignored this order and continued to resist Soviet occupation.

From 22nd to the 28th of August, troops of the Kamchatka Defense Area occupied the Kuril Islands from Urup north.

On the 1st of September, elements of the 87th Rifle Corps were landed by torpedo boats, mine trawlers and transports (departing from Otomari) on Kunashir and Shikotan in the southern Kuril Islands. This was an assault landing against Japanese resistance. On September 4th, 87th Rifle Corps occupied five smaller islands (Sibotzu, Taraku-Shima, Uri-Shima, Akiuri, and Suiseto).

After September 4th, Soviet forces occupied the rest of the Kuril Islands without further resistance.

The islands remained part of Russia after the dissolution of the Soviet Union, but their true legal status remains in question as part of the Kuril Islands dispute between Russia and Japan.

== See also ==
- Battle of Shumshu
- Japanese evacuation of Karafuto and the Kuril Islands
- Soviet invasion of South Sakhalin
