= Battle of Shumshu =

Soviet–Japanese WWII battle

- Part of the Invasion of the Kuril Islands during World War II
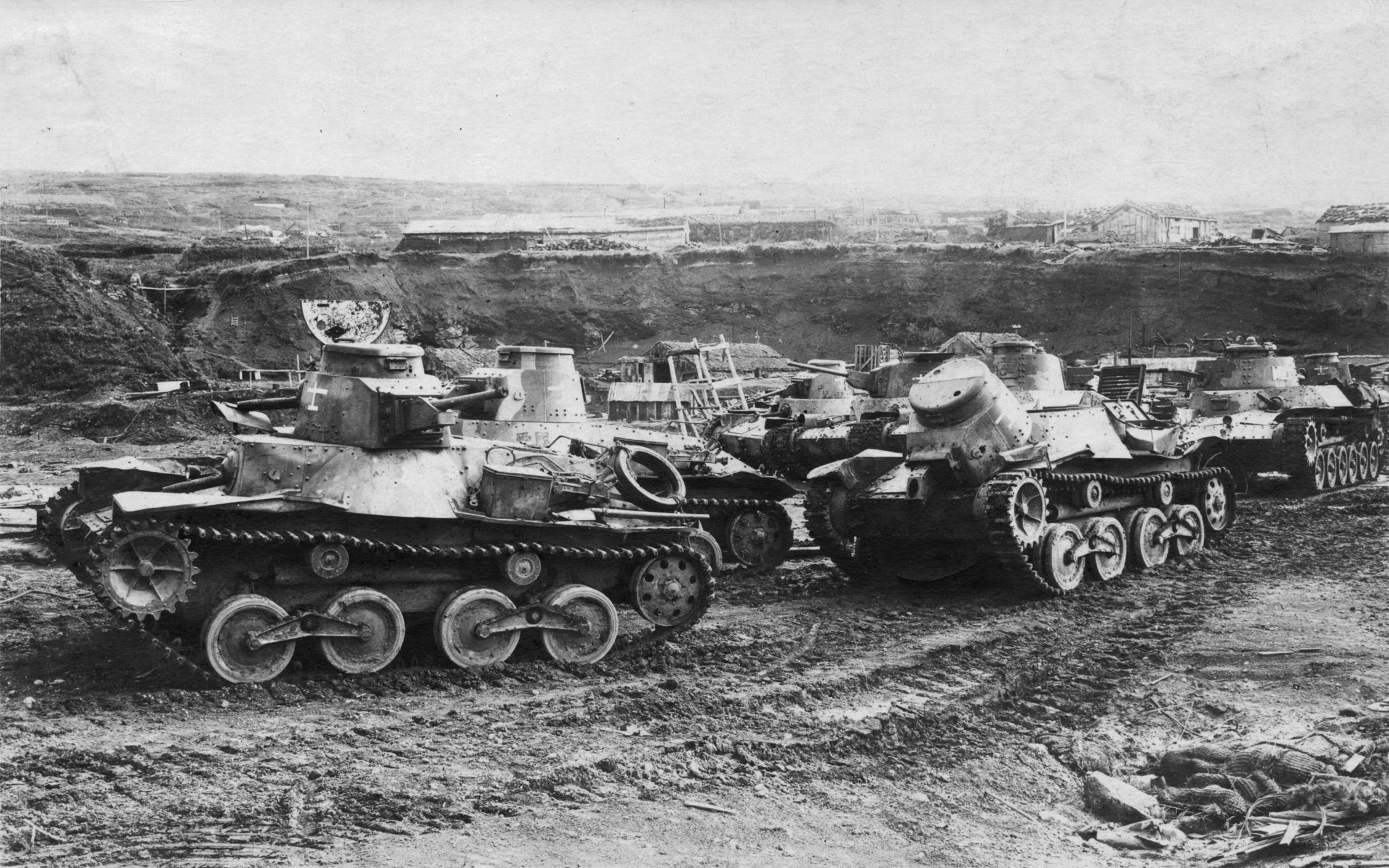
- Damaged Japanese tanks on Shumshu
Date	18–23 August 1945
Location	Shumshu, Kuril Islands 50°44′N 156°19′E
Result	Soviet victory
Territorial changes	Shumshu annexed by the Soviet Union

Belligerents
Soviet Union	(Empire of Japan) Japan

Commanders and leaders
(Soviet Union) Aleksei Gnechko (Soviet Union) Dmitry Ponomarev	(Empire of Japan) Fusaki Tsutsumi (surrendered) (Empire of Japan) Ikeda Sueo †

Units involved
2nd Far Eastern Front: Kamchatka Defense District; 101st Rifle Division; 138th Rifle Regiment; 373rd Rifle Regiment; 279th Light Artillery Regiment; 169th Anti-tank Divizion; 302nd Separate Rifle Regiment; Machine Gun Company; Mortar Company; Soviet Pacific Fleet: 365th Separate Marine Battalion	27th Army; 91st Division; 11th Armored Regiment; 73rd Infantry Brigade; 51st Rikusentai Base; 52nd Rikusentai Base; 31st Air Defence Detachment; No 51 and No. 52 Guard Unit, and Shumshu Communications Unit, 12th Air Fleet

Strength
8,821 troops 64 ships and craft	8,480–8,500 troops 77 tanks

Casualties and losses
Soviet claim: 1,516–3,472 total, as 516–2,421 killed or died of wounds (excluding naval personnel) and 1,000–1,051 wounded or missing Five landing ships destroyed Japanese claim: 3,000 to 4,500 killed and wounded	Japanese claim: 600 total, as 191 killed and c. 409 wounded 20 tanks destroyed Soviet claim: 1,018 total, either as: 369 killed and 649 wounded or 473 killed/died of wounds and 545 wounded

The Battle of Shumshu, the Soviet invasion of Shumshu in the Kuril Islands, was the first stage of the Soviet Union's Invasion of the Kuril Islands in August–September 1945 during World War II. It took place from 18 to 23 August 1945, and was the only major battle of the Soviet campaign in the Kuril Islands and arguably the very last battle of World War II.

== Background ==
The Soviet Union and Japan maintained neutrality toward each other after signing the Soviet–Japanese Neutrality Pact on 13 April 1941, although the two countries were allied with each other's World War II enemies from 1941 until the conclusion of the war in 1945. The Soviet Union turned down Allied requests for any actions which might provoke Japan, but discussed plans to base American aircraft on Soviet territory for operations against Japan after the Soviet Union had declared war on Japan.

Joseph Stalin said that the Soviet entry into the war against Japan would not be possible until after a three-month period following Germany's defeat, per an assurance he offered to the United States Ambassador to the Soviet Union, W. Averell Harriman, at an October 1944 meeting. Stalin further stipulated as part of the agreement that it would include the Allies providing substantial assistance to the Soviet Union in building up its armed forces and military supplies in East Asia and the Pacific in advance of any Soviet operations against Japan. The United States soon began the work of meeting the Soviet requirements outside of and in addition to annual Lend-Lease allotments of aid to the Soviets, including the transfer of a dozen types of ships and aircraft from the United States to the Soviet armed forces. In the spring and summer of 1945, the United States secretly transferred 149 ships and craft – mostly escort vessels, landing craft, and minesweepers – to the Red Fleet at Cold Bay in the Territory of Alaska in Project Hula. Even so, cooperation between the Soviets and Americans was minimal and in August 1945 the Soviets did not have the capability to mount a major sea-borne invasion of Japanese-held territory.

As Stalin had promised, the Soviet Union declared war against Japan on 8 August 1945, exactly three months after the capitulation of Germany, and began an offensive against Japanese forces in Northeast Asia the next day. During August, Soviet forces attacked Japanese forces in the puppet state of Manchukuo in Manchuria, in the Japanese province of Karafuto on the southern half of Sakhalin Island, and the northern half of Korea, a Japanese possession at the time. Another Soviet goal during the offensive was the occupation of the Kuril Islands.

Shumshu is located at the northernmost part of the Kuril Islands and to the northeast, it faces Cape Lopatka on the Kamchatka Peninsula, separated by the Chishima Strait (Russia's "First Kuril Strait"). To the south, there is the Horomushiro Strait (Russia's "Second Kuril Strait") which separates it from Horomushiro Island. The area covers 230 square kilometers, with gently rolling hills at about 200 meters above sea level, consisting of marshlands and grasslands. It is surrounded by the Sea of Okhotsk and the Pacific Ocean. Even in summer, the temperature hovers around 15 °C, and dense fog often covers the area. In winter, temperatures drop to −15 °C, accompanied by blizzards.

In the secret agreement made during the Yalta Conference in February 1945, the Soviet Union (USSR) was to enter the war against Japan. In return, after the war, southern Sakhalin (South Sakhalin) and territories south of the 50th parallel north were to be ceded to the Soviet Union, and the Kuril Islands were to be handed over. However, in the notification sent by US President Harry S. Truman to Soviet Premier Joseph Stalin on 15 August, regarding the division of the Japanese military's surrender responsibilities, the Kuril Islands were not included as part of the Soviet zone. As a result, the Soviet side demanded that the Kuril Islands and the northeastern part of Hokkaido (the area north of the "Hokkaido Stalin Line" or "Rukushin Wall," which connects Kushiro and Rumoi) be included in the Soviet-controlled area. The United States, in its response on the 17th, rejected the northeastern part of Hokkaido but agreed to the inclusion of the Kuril Islands.

Stalin argued that his right to control half of Hokkaido was a retaliation for the Siberian Intervention, and sought to seize the eastern part of Hokkaido through a rapid conquest of the Kuril Islands and Sakhalin. According to the "War History Series", the Soviet Union rushed to establish control over the Kuril Islands because the United States had requested the construction of airfields in the region, making it necessary for the Soviets to solidify their dominance there. In fact, after the ceasefire in Sakhalin on August 22, Stalin informed Truman that he would abandon the claim to Hokkaido, but negotiations regarding airfield construction continued with the United States over the Kuril Islands. On the 23rd, Nikolai Slavin, head of the Soviet General Staff, inquired through US Army Brigadier General John R. Deane, who was stationed in Moscow, to the US military command in Manila, asking, "Was it the American army that landed on Shumshu Island?" The US side replied that it was not the American army but the Soviet army. This exchange is documented in the telegram preserved at the MacArthur Memorial. Additionally, Brigadier General Deane mentioned in his memoir, Strange Alliance: The Story of Our Efforts to Cooperate with Russia During the War, that the Soviets suspected that the US had occupied the Kuril Islands. If even the upper echelons of the Soviet General Staff were unaware of the operation to invade the Kuril Islands, the operation may have been a highly secret mission based on the Yalta secret agreement.

== Preparations ==
On 15 August 1945, the commander-in-chief of Soviet armed forces in the Soviet Far East, Marshal of the Soviet Union Aleksandr M. Vasilevsky, ordered the commander of the Red Army's Second Far Eastern Front, General Maksim A. Purkayev, and the commander of the Red Fleet's Pacific Ocean Fleet, Admiral Ivan S. Yumashev, to take the first step in the conquest of the Kuril Islands by occupying the islands of Shumshu and Paramushiro at the northern end of the archipelago, just off the southern tip of the Soviet Union's Kamchatka Peninsula. Soviet forces first were to take Shumshu, then Paramushiro; with these two islands under control, the rest of the island chain, which was only lightly held, would fall easily.

Purkayev and Yumashev placed the commander of the Red Army's Kamchatka Defense Zone, General A. R. Gnechko, and the commander of the naval base at Petropavlovsk-Kamchatsky, Captain 1st Rank Dmitri G. Ponomarev, in charge of the Shumshu operation, with Gnechko in overall command. Gnechko and Pomomarev had orders to assemble an assault force from forces locally available on the Kamchatka Peninsula and land on Shumshu within 48 hours.

=== Forces ===
==== Japanese ====
The Japanese side, under the command of General Kiyichiro Higuchi, who headed the 5th Area Army (a unit of the Imperial Japanese Army), had been fortifying Shumshu Island and Horomushiro Island in anticipation of a war against the United States. By 1945, with preparations for the decisive battle on the home islands and the defense of Hokkaido, troops were withdrawn from the southern Kuril Islands such as Etorofu Island. However, at the time of Japan's surrender, the 91st Division (which consisted of two brigades) was still stationed there. The division's soldiers were mostly survivors of the Nomonhan Incident and the Battle of Guadalcanal, and many had also participated in the Kiska Island evacuation operation, making them highly experienced. Furthermore, as the northern front had seen little combat, stocks of food and ammunition were relatively abundant. Elite forces from Manchuria, such as the 11th Tank Regiment, were also stationed there.

As for air power, even combining the Army Air Squadrons and the Imperial Japanese Navy Air Units, only eight outdated aircraft remained by 1945.

Even by 1945, the main adversary that Japan expected to fight was the United States, and there were no special provisions made for preparedness against the Soviet Union. The defensive preparations for the U.S. were simply repurposed for defense against the Soviet Union. With a reduction in defensive strength, the deployment strategy shifted from a decisive battle focus to ensuring control of critical zones, with particular emphasis on blocking passage through the Horomushiro Strait. As a result, in May, the Japanese Army concentrated its forces in the southern part of Horomushiro Island, particularly near Kashiwabara, which faced the Horomushiro Strait. On Shumshu Island, four battalions were concentrated in the southern part, while only one infantry battalion was assigned to the landing area at Takeda Beach as part of a guerrilla warfare mission. In the two beaches to the south, one infantry battalion was stationed on each, and an artillery battery of one company was stationed at the Kunichihama battery. The infantry battalions were tasked with a depth defense, primarily engaging in disruption of enemy forces rather than direct defense along the water's edge. Some key positions in the north, such as Kunichihama and Shimoyama, were to be held at all costs to prevent the enemy from advancing inland.

The Imperial Japanese Army's 91st Division garrisoned both Shumshu and nearby Paramushiro, with about 8,500 troops on Shumshu and 15,000 more troops on Paramushiro. The garrisons were able to reinforce one another if necessary. The Japanese fielded 77 tanks. Against this force, Gnechko was able to field two reinforced Soviet Army rifle divisions and a Soviet Naval Infantry battalion with a combined total of 8,824 officers and men and a naval task force of 64 small ships and craft to carry them to Shumshu. The Soviets had no tanks and no major warships to commit to the operation, but enjoyed an advantage in artillery and mortars.

The Imperial Japanese Navy had placed a special naval base force in the Kuril Islands, but similarly to the army, it moved its main forces to Hokkaido and disbanded, leaving behind only the 51st and 52nd security units stationed in the southern bases.

The total force was approximately 25,000 personnel. However, the Japanese forces directly involved in the fighting on the 18th were only about 8,500 men, consisting of the three infantry battalions and one artillery company stationed around Takeda Beach, along with reinforcements. According to Soviet sources, reinforcements sent to the site included, according to testimonies in Shōwa History of the Emperor, one infantry battalion, one tank regiment, one engineer company, and possibly an additional battalion gathered together. These reinforcements, along with two artillery companies dispatched from Shumshu Island, were gradually sent to the front as they were ready. According to the "War History Series," the Japanese strategy was to eventually deploy all forces to eliminate the enemy and then return to the dual fortress positions on Shumshu and Horomushiro Islands. After the ceasefire, it was reported under Soviet instructions that, although some soldiers who had temporarily come from Horomushiro Island had already returned, 16,600 soldiers remained on Shumshu Island.

Imperial Japanese Army (about 23,000 men)

  - 91st Division: Division Commander, Major General Fukiyoshi Tsutsumi; the division headquarters and the 74th Infantry Brigade (5 battalions) were stationed on the island of Poromiyoshi.
  - 73rd Infantry Brigade (5 battalions): Brigade Commander, Major General Iwao Sugino, stationed at Chitose-dai.
  - Independent Infantry Battalion 282: Battalion Commander, Major Norishige Murakami, stationed at Shiren-yama.
  - Independent Infantry Battalion 283: stationed at Chitose-dai.
  - 11th Tank Regiment (20 Type 97 Medium Tanks "New Turret Chi-Ha", 19 Type 97 Medium Tanks "Old Turret Chi-Ha": total 39 tanks, 25 Type 95 Light Tanks). According to the testimony of tank unit officers, the regiment had a total of 89 tanks, mainly the latest Type 1 Medium Tanks, with some Type 97 Medium Tanks, and each company had one fast Type 95 Light Tank for reconnaissance and communication purposes.
  - Regiment Commander: Colonel Sueo Ikeda, attached to the division, stationed at Chitose-dai.
    - 1st Company: Yamadano
    - 2nd Company: Tazawadai
    - 3rd Company: Tenjinyama
    - 4th Company: Yamato Bridge
    - 5th Company: Midorigaoka
    - 6th Company: Kitanishi
    - 11th Anti-Aircraft Wireless Unit
  - Transport Engineer Battalion 57 – 20 Special Large Landing Crafts.
- Imperial Japanese Navy (Commander Lieutenant Colonel Haruki Ito, about 1,500 men):
  - Shumshu Communications Unit (Commander: Lieutenant Colonel Haruki Ito)
  - 51st Security Unit
  - 52nd Security Unit
- Air Force
  - Army 54th Flying Squadron Remnant – 4 Type 1 Fighter Aircraft "Hayabusa".
  - Navy Northeastern Air Force, Northern Kurils Dispatch Unit – 4 Type 97 Carrier Attack Aircraft.

==== Soviets ====
On August 15, 1945, Marshal Aleksandr Vasilevsky, the Commander-in-Chief of the Soviet Far Eastern Army, ordered the preparation and execution of an operation to occupy the northern Kuril Islands. This order was directed to the headquarters of the 2nd Far Eastern Front (Commander: General Maksim Purlkaev) and the Pacific Fleet (Commander: Admiral Ivan Yumashev). The operation was to begin with a surprise landing on Takeda Beach in the northeast part of Shumshu Island on the night of August 17, then proceed southward towards the Kataoka Naval Base, with the goal of occupying the entire island, including the base, by sunset on August 18.

The participating forces were as follows. On the Japanese side, the Soviet Union's landing force was estimated at 13,000 personnel.

2nd Far Eastern Front

- Kamchatka Defense District (Commander: Major General Aleksei Gnechiko)
  - 101st Rifle Division (Division Commander: Major General Porfiry Dyakov)
      - 138th Rifle Regiment
      - 373rd Rifle Regiment
      - 428th Howitzer Regiment
      - 279th Artillery Regiment
      - 169th Independent Anti-Tank Gun Battalion
      - 198th Rifle Regiment
    - 5th Independent Rifle Battalion
    - 7th Independent Rifle Battalion and others.
- Navy
  - Petropavlovsk-Kamchatsky Naval Base (Commander: Captain Dmitri Ponomaryov)
  - 2 patrol ships (Kirov, Zherzhinski), 1 minesweeper, 4 minesweepers, 14 transport ships, 16 landing craft, totaling 54 ships. One battalion of naval infantry.
- Air Force (78 aircraft)
  - 128th Mixed Aviation Division of the Red Air Force
  - One naval aviation regiment

Regarding the advance into southern Sakhalin and the Kuril Islands, the Red Fleet, particularly the Pacific Fleet, was facing a shortage of warships. To address this, as part of the Lend-Lease program, the United States and the Soviet Union jointly executed the "Plan Fray" (also known as the "Fray Project") in Alaska, where warships were lent and crew members trained.

=== Planning ===
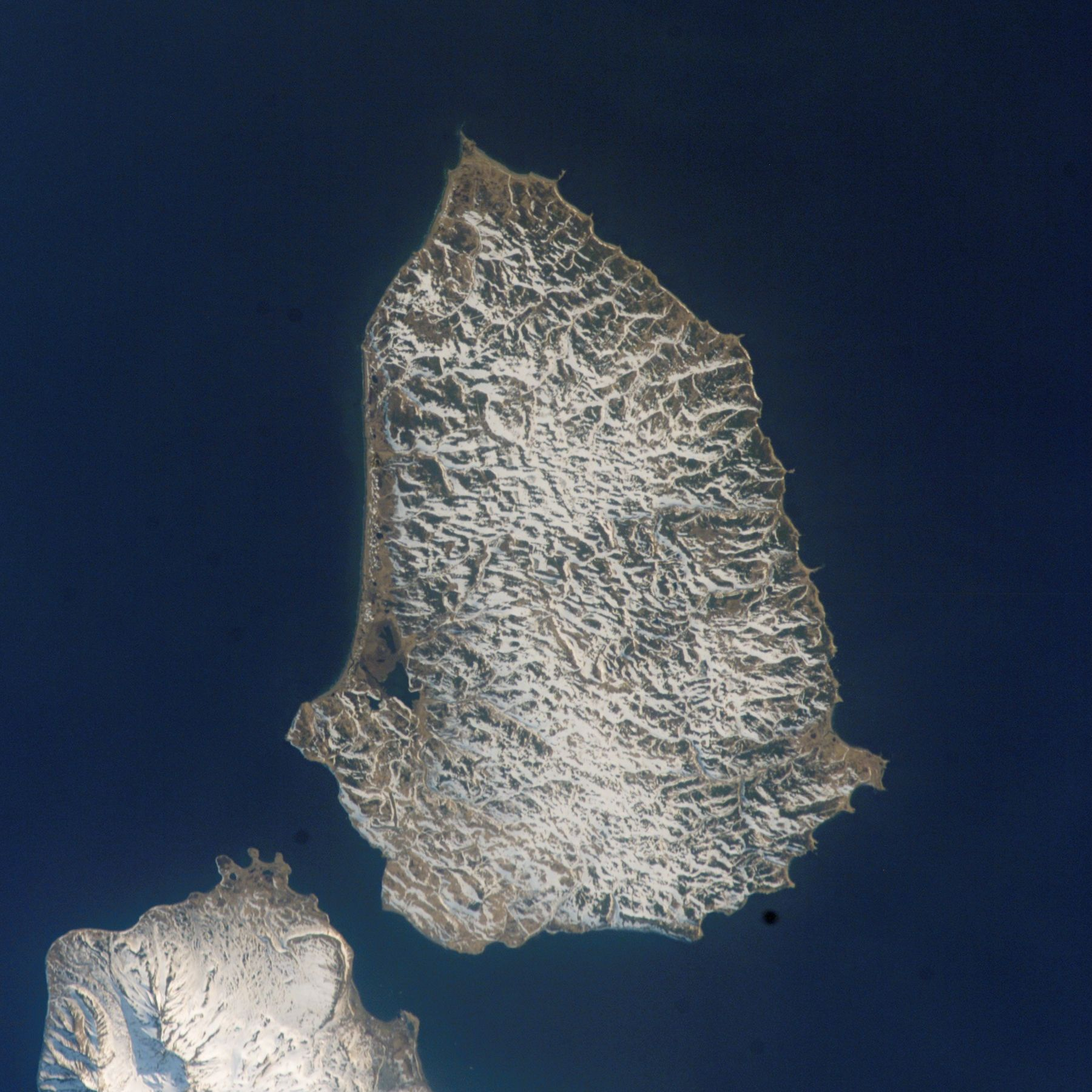
A Landsat 7 image of Shumshu. The northern tip of Paramushir (formerly Paramushiro) is at left. The First Kuril Strait lies across the upper portion of the image.

Gnechko and Ponomarev assessed the challenging schedule, concluding that the movement of a force over the 170 nautical miles (310 km; 200 mi) from Petropavlovsk-Kamchatsky to Shumshu in the world's foggiest waters would itself take 24 hours, leaving them only 24 hours to assemble an assault force if they were to meet the requirement to land on Shumshu by the evening of 17 August 1945 as ordered. Gnechko requested and received a 24-hour postponement, which moved the landing requirement to no later than the evening of 18 August 1945.

Although Soviet intelligence reports indicated that the Japanese troops on Shumshu were demoralized by Japanese Emperor Hirohito's announcement on 15 August 1945 that Japan intended to surrender, Gnechko believed that the Japanese advantage in numbers could put the operation in jeopardy. Chronically poor weather in the area limited the ability of Soviet aircraft to conduct reconnaissance or provide support to a landing, but they were tasked to attack Paramushiro's naval base to interdict Japanese reinforcements attempting to reach Shumshu.

Gnechko also feared that his force lacked sufficient artillery and naval gunfire support for its initial landing. The ships of the landing force had few large guns – the largest of them, the minesweeper Okhotsk, had only one 130-mm (5.1-inch) and two 76.2-mm (3-inch) guns – and he doubted the Red Fleet's ability to provide enough gunfire support to counter Japanese coastal artillery; moreover he and Ponomarev doubted the ability of the small ships available to remain on station and provide effective shore bombardment while both under fire from Japanese coastal batteries and fighting strong currents in the First Kuril Strait.

Gnechko planned to rely on four 130-mm (5.1-inch) guns on Cape Lopatka on the southern tip of the Kamchatka Peninsula to provide additional artillery support by firing 12 km (7.5 statute miles) across the First Kuril Strait against targets on Shumshu, but saw it as critical that Soviet infantry quickly establish a beachhead deep and secure enough to allow Soviet ships to unload artillery and mortars at Shumshu itself; he believed that only then would the Soviet advantage in artillery begin to express itself. However, the Soviet ground forces to be committed had little or no experience in amphibious warfare and little time for familiarization with Shumshu itself, and this, too, threatened the Soviet ability to establish the necessary beachhead. Gnechko hoped that by focusing the landing force in a concentrated attack on a small area, he could overcome these difficulties and establish a secure beachhead on which the Soviets could deploy artillery and mortars quickly.

On the Japanese side, the 91st Infantry Division did not expect a Soviet attack. However, the Kurils had been a Japanese possession since 1875, and Japanese forces had garrisoned them throughout World War II, giving them great familiarity with the terrain. Nearby Paramushiro had been the major Japanese base in the North Pacific during the war, and Japanese coastal artillery was sited to defend against amphibious assaults on Shumshu. Japanese forces fighting the Soviets elsewhere in Northeast Asia had demonstrated an ability to put up a spirited defense, despite Japan's announced intention to surrender and the cessation of hostilities with the other Allies as of 15 August 1945.

== Landings ==
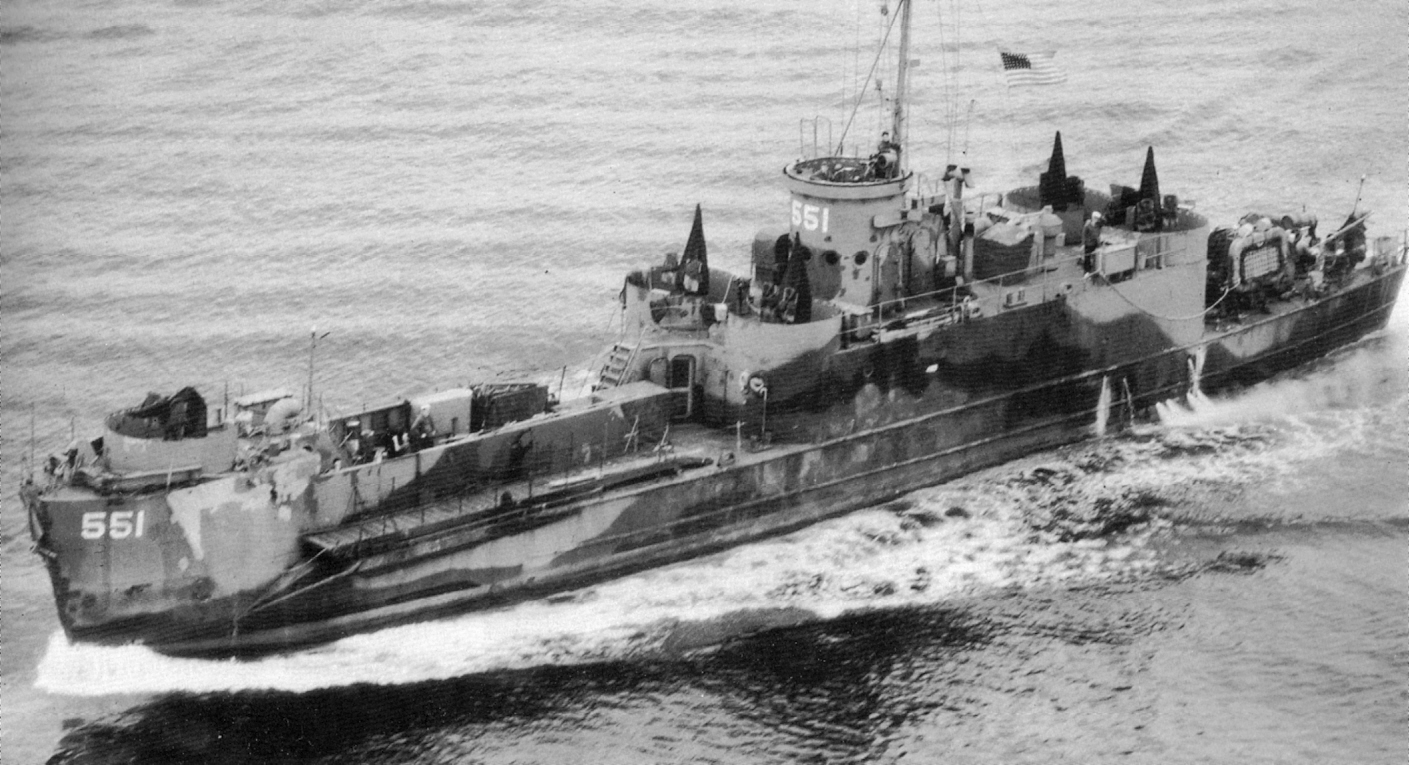
The large infantry landing craft USS LCI(L)-551 in May 1945, flying her colors at half-mast in honor of the recently deceased President Franklin D. Roosevelt. Transferred to the Red Fleet at Cold Bay, Territory of Alaska, on 29 July 1945 in Project Hula, she became DS-48 and took part in the Soviet Invasion of the Kuril Islands, in which Japanese coastal artillery destroyed five of her sister ships during the 18 August 1945 Shumshu landings. The Soviet Union returned her to the United States in 1955.

=== Situation before the landing ===
On August 12, the American fleet carried out naval gunfire on the northern Kurils, including Poromiyoshi Island, but it did not target Shumushu Island.

On the 14th, Soviet coastal artillery (4 x 130mm coastal guns) stationed at Cape Lopatka on the Kamchatka Peninsula fired several shells onto the sandy beach near Takeda-hama.

On the 15th, the Japanese acceptance of the Potsdam Declaration was announced, and by noon, the Allied forces, except for the Soviet forces, ceased active operations, and most of the battlefronts entered a ceasefire state. However, later in the evening on the same day, an unidentified aircraft bombed Shumushu Island. The continuous American air raids had stopped by this time.

At 5:00 AM on the 17th, the Soviet amphibious fleet departed from its anchorage and proceeded while sealing communications. Around 6:30 AM on the same day, three aircraft from the Navy Flying Regiment conducted reconnaissance and bombing runs over Shumushu Island. Furthermore, during the daytime on the 17th, aircraft from the 128th Composite Flying Division carried out successive bombing raids on military targets on Shumushu Island. The coastal artillery at Cape Lopatka also fired at a Soviet tanker stranded at Shumushu's Komatani, which had been abandoned. It was believed by the Japanese soldiers that the shells were fired as a show of force, considering there was no longer a need to retain the shells after the war ended.

On the other hand, after the August 15th Gyokuon-housou (Imperial Rescript on the Termination of the War), the 5th Area Army in Hokkaido issued an order stating: "All combat actions are to cease as of the 17th, with the exception of self-defense actions which are allowed when absolutely necessary. The complete and thorough cessation of hostilities will take place by 16:00 on the 18th." By the 17th, the order had been passed to each unit, and preparations for disarmament, such as removing tank guns, were underway. The disposal of chemical weapons by sea had already been completed. The Japanese forces had noticed the movement of numerous boats along the Kamchatka Peninsula coast on the 17th, but they did not consider the possibility of a Soviet invasion after the war. However, on the night of the 17th, some coastal bases were placed on alert. At the front lines near Takeda-hama, one company from Independent Infantry Battalion 282 (under Battalion Commander Norishige Murakami) was deployed, along with three battalion guns, three rapid-fire guns, two field guns, and four mortars.

In the afternoon of the 17th, the Shumushu defense force headquarters, having received the ceasefire order from the Imperial General Headquarters on the 16th, gathered the commanders of each unit at the Kashiwa base on Poromiyoshi Island for a meeting. Division Commander Tsutsumi gave a speech, stating that hostilities would cease at 16:00 on the 18th, but self-defense actions would be allowed in unavoidable situations. He emphasized the need to refrain from hasty actions and instructed that if any military envoys arrived, they should immediately contact the division headquarters. According to Colonel Mukuo Kaseya, the artillery commander, the order at that time was: "Although there is a possibility of a Soviet landing, if they land, do not engage in combat and follow subsequent orders accordingly".

=== Soviet forces' landing ===
At the meeting on the 17th, it was decided that even if Soviet forces landed, the Japanese forces would not initiate combat. However, according to testimony from Kaseya and others, the division's policy suddenly changed, and by the night of the 17th, they received orders to fight if Soviet forces landed. Hiroshi Itani believes that the change in the division's policy was likely due to the message that Keiichiro Higuchi, the commander of the 5th Area Army, had decided on a combat strategy with the Soviet Union for the defense of Hokkaido.

Meanwhile, in the Shōwa History of the Emperor, based on an interview with the Yomiuri Shimbun, Mizuho Mitsu (the division's operations staff officer) recalled that they had always assumed the enemy was the U.S. military, and it wasn't until the weather cleared and the identity of the enemy became clear much later in the day that they realized it was the Soviet army. Many of the soldiers on the ground also testified that they only realized the enemy was the Soviet army much later.

Japanese coastal artillery soon found the range against Soviet ships. Almost completely lacking radio communication with the troops ashore, the Soviet ships' attempts at naval gunfire support were ineffective. When the Soviet second wave headed for shore at 05:30, led by 16 ex-U.S. Navy large infantry landing craft (LCI(L)s – now redesignated as desantiye suda) (DS, or "landing ship") – Japanese artillery laid down heavy fire against it. By the time it had finished unloading the second wave at 09:00, Japanese artillery fire had destroyed five landing ships – DS-1 (ex-USS LCI(L)-672), DS-5 (ex-USS LCI(L)-525), DS-9 (ex-USS LCI(L)-554), DS-43 (ex-USS LCI(L)-943), and DS-47 (ex-USS LCI(L)-671). The Soviet second wave came ashore without its artillery and mortars and with few of its radios.

Around 2:30 AM on August 18 (Japan Standard Time), Soviet advance elements of a naval infantry battalion landed at Takeda-hama on Shumushu Island. Due to the excessive weight of their equipment, the Soviet forces were unable to reach the shore by boat and had to swim ashore.

The Independent Infantry Battalion 282, which was defending Takeda-hama, immediately launched an attack, while the Soviet forces began naval gunfire and supporting bombardments from Cape Lopatka. There is a debate as to which side fired first—both the Japanese and the Soviets claim they did. According to Major Murakami of the 282nd Battalion, the enemy did not fire before landing. According to Soviet sources, naval ships started firing prematurely before the Japanese forces realized it.

The Japanese side reported that naval gunfire resumed around 1:30 AM from Cape Lopatka, and Major Murakami ordered firing after concluding that the incoming forces were not a military envoy but rather a large landing force. Soviet sources, however, state that naval gunfire from Cape Lopatka began at 2:15 AM Soviet time (0:15 AM Japan time). Despite minor losses among the advance elements, they landed on the beach within 30 minutes and pushed forward deep into the island, ignoring the coastal defenses.

Around 3:30 AM, the main landing force, the 1st echelon (the 138th Rifle Regiment), began to land. The Japanese forces fiercely counterattacked and reported sinking 13 landing craft. According to Soviet sources, two landing craft, including the command craft, were set ablaze, and several others were damaged. By 7:00 AM, the landing of the 1st echelon was completed, but only four anti-tank guns had landed, and with the loss of their headquarters ship, the Soviet forces had difficulty organizing their units. Soviet naval gunfire attempted to suppress the Japanese artillery, but it was ineffective. The 2nd echelon (the 373rd Rifle Regiment) began landing around 7:00 AM. Due to continued Japanese artillery fire, the landing was delayed, and by around 10:00 AM, it was completed, though many of the heavy weapons remained on the transport ships.

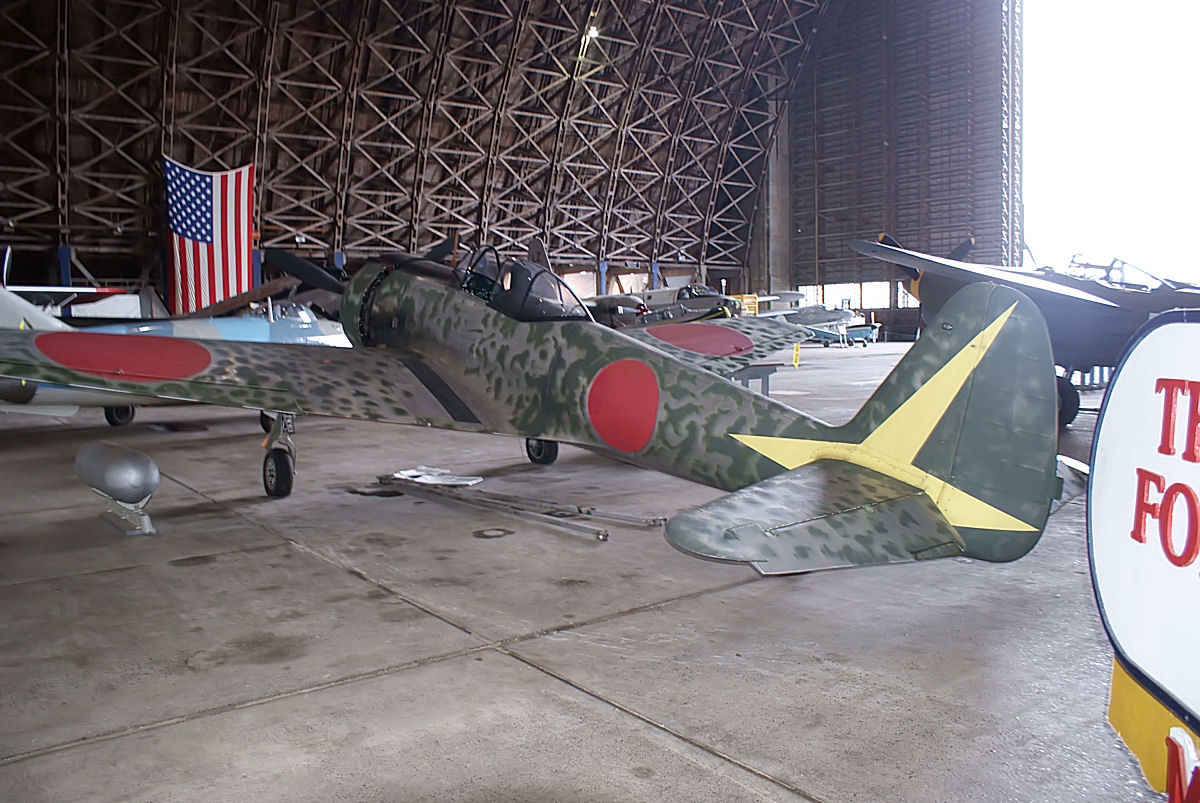
The Japanese Army's Type 1 Fighter (Ki-43 III), part of the 54th Sendai, which had been active in the Kuril Islands since August 1943. It bears a design of an "origami crane" on its tail and vertical stabilizer as its squadron insignia. This aircraft was restored to flight from wreckage of a 54th Sendai aircraft recovered from the Kurils.

To support the 91st Division's forces, both the remaining elements of the 54th Army Flying Squadron and the Navy's North-East Air Force were dispatched from Shumushu Airfield (Kataoka Airfield). Four Type 1 Fighters (Ki-43s) from the Army flew escort for four Type 97 Naval Attack Bombers. However, since there were no Soviet aircraft, the Army fighters attacked minesweepers. The Type 97 Naval Attack Bombers began bombing and hit a Soviet transport ship with a 800 kg bomb. One of the bombers, severely damaged by anti air fire, then performed a kamikaze attack on the Soviet minesweeper KT-152, which sank with 17 crew members aboard, marking the last kamikaze attack success in the Pacific War.

On the same day, Lieutenant Ryoji Shiozuka of the 901st Naval Air Group, operating from the Chinju Naval Base in the Korean Peninsula, independently launched a kamikaze mission against the Soviet tanker Taganrog near Vladivostok. However, he was shot down by anti-aircraft fire just before reaching his target.

The Soviet forces that landed faced fierce resistance from the Japanese military, but by around 4 a.m., they had approached Mount Shirane. A fierce battle was fought around Mount Shirane between the Soviet and Japanese forces. Due to the bad weather, the Soviet forces were unable to directly support their ground troops with aircraft.

Initially, the Japanese side could not definitively identify the landing forces as Soviet troops and considered their nationality unknown. However, as time passed, they recognized them as Soviet forces. After receiving the report that the Soviet forces had landed on Shumshu Island, Major General Tokichiro Higuchi, commander of the Fifth Area Army, issued an order to the 91st Division to "decisively counterattack and annihilate the Soviet forces." The division commander, General Tsutomu Tsutsumi, ordered the artillery that could shoot to fire at the landing site, and instructed Colonel Sueo Ikeda, who commanded the 11th Tank Regiment (later promoted to Brigadier General after his death), along with a portion of the division's engineering units, to advance towards Kokotan and eliminate the enemy. At the same time, other units under the 73rd Brigade were ordered to gather as much force as possible and engage the enemy with full strength, while the 74th Brigade stationed on Poromushiro Island was ordered to move towards Shumshu Island using transport boats from the naval engineer units. In response, the 11th Tank Regiment immediately set out, and the 73rd Brigade deployed the Independent Infantry Battalion 283 (led by Lieutenant Colonel Miyoji Takeshita) stationed at Numajiri to the Soviet forces' eastern flank, while advancing other subordinate units toward Kokotan Cape.

The 11th Tank Regiment, consisting of Type 97 medium tanks, Type 97 medium tanks with a new turret (Chi-Ha), and Type 95 light tanks, worked in cooperation with the naval guard force's Type 2 internal combustion boats (Type 2 tanks). Around 6:50 a.m. on the 18th, the regiment's commanding officer led a banzai charge against the Soviet forces on Mount Shirane and drove them back, then advanced further up the northern slope of Mount Shirane. The Soviet forces fiercely resisted by concentrating anti-tank weapons (4 anti-tank guns, about 100 anti-tank rifles, and anti-tank phosphorus grenades), destroying Japanese tanks one by one. However, after being hit by anti-aircraft fire from the Japanese forces stationed southeast of Mount Shirane and with reinforcements from the Independent Infantry Battalion 283 joining the fight, the Soviet forces retreated to the north side of Mount Shirane, leaving behind numerous abandoned bodies. The 11th Tank Regiment lost 27 tanks, and 97 soldiers, including Colonel Ikeda and many officers, were killed in action. The naval guard force's Type 2 internal combustion boats also suffered losses, but several remained, and after the war, they were captured by the Soviet forces and displayed at the Kubinka Tank Museum.

Later, the Japanese Independent Infantry Battalion 283 advanced toward Kokotan Cape and recaptured strategic positions that had already been occupied by the Soviet forces. The Soviet forces launched an attack to retake the area, and fierce combat ensued. The battalion commander was seriously wounded, and over 50 soldiers, including the adjutant, were killed in action. However, the battalion successfully secured the position and assisted in the assembly of the main forces of the 73rd Brigade to the south side of Mount Shirane. During this battle, the Soviet 130mm guns at Cape Ropatka fired at the Japanese forces, while the Japanese 96mm 15 cm cannon on Mount Shirane responded, but eventually all of their guns were destroyed and fell silent.

By the afternoon of the 18th, the Japanese forces had secured the position at Kokotan Cape, and the 11th Tank Regiment and the main forces of the 73rd Infantry Brigade were deployed southeast of Mount Shirane, with some units of the 74th Infantry Brigade covering the left flank and rear. With the arrival of reinforcements, it seemed possible that the Japanese forces could gradually annihilate the Soviet forces, and the division decided to pursue this course of action. However, according to the "War History Series," it was also said that the Japanese forces were in a vulnerable position against the Soviet breakthrough attack.

Meanwhile, Japanese soldiers who had been dispatched as messengers had already witnessed heavy weapons being unloaded at Takeda Beach, and many more follow-up transport ships were coming, which led them to believe that a fight could likely be avoided. However, the original orders from the Imperial General Headquarters allowed for defensive combat, but insisted that ceasefire negotiations be conducted by 4:00 p.m. on the 18th. In the early afternoon, the Fifth Area Army issued an order to cease combat, and the 91st Division followed this order and ceased active combat at 4:00 p.m. (According to the "War History Series," the area army later referred to the subsequent defensive combat as "self-defense combat".) On the other hand, Commander Tokichiro Higuchi, in his "Posthumous Collection," described the entire battle of the 18th as "self-defense action", and emphasized the belief that the fighting should end with an apology from the unlawful side (which likely meant an apology from the Soviet side), awaiting the results of the war. He expressed regret over the failure to fully enforce accountability for the unlawful side.

In reality, sporadic fighting continued in various areas. By nightfall, the 74th Infantry Brigade from Poromushiro Island had completed its main force's transfer to Shumshu Island. The Soviet forces launched an airstrike during a break in the fog to attack naval transport operations, but they were unable to stop them. While large-scale fighting had mostly ceased, Soviet forces attempted to approach and scout, and near the coastal batteries at Kokotan Cape, the Japanese forces shot and killed these forces. At around 3:00 a.m. on the 19th, a telephone line was established between Takeshita's battalion and the brigade headquarters at Kokotan Cape, but Soviet forces who approached along the line killed all the communications troops who had completed the telephone line work and advanced to the battalion's headquarters. They destroyed the mortar squad and engaged the main forces in combat. A white flag was raised in front of the headquarters, and when gunfire diminished, Sergeant Major Kojima, who spoke Russian, attempted to negotiate a ceasefire, but Soviet forces mistook it for a trap when the rearward Japanese forces began firing machine guns from another direction. Kojima was shot and killed, and a chaotic battle broke out. The battalion commander was injured, and over 50 soldiers, including the adjutant, were killed in action. Having arrived late at Mount Shirane, Lieutenant Nakazawa, the only surviving tank commander, seemingly unable to bear the pressure or tension, advanced alone and did not return. By the end of the battle, Lieutenant Itou Chikio was the only remaining commander of a surviving tank unit.

At 09:10, Soviet forces on Shumshu – badly in need of reinforcements and supplies – finally established radio contact with the ships offshore and with the four guns on Cape Lopatka. The gunfire from Cape Lopatka was particularly effective, and the Soviet troops held out against repeated Japanese counterattacks. By the afternoon, with the weather improving, Soviet aircraft began to attack the naval base on Paramushiro to prevent Japanese reinforcements from reaching Shumshu, and the Soviets had established good communications between their troops ashore, gunfire support ships, and Soviet aircraft, which combined to inflict heavy casualties on counterattacking Japanese. By the evening of 18 August 1945, the Soviets had established a beachhead 4 km (2.5 mi) wide and 5 to 6 km (3.1 to 3.7 mi) deep and had managed to bring artillery and mortars ashore.

Although the ceasefire was to begin at 4:00 p.m. on the 18th, the Soviet forces landing troops (two sniper regiments and a naval infantry battalion) were unaware of this and continued their attacks. With support from the fleet and artillery from Cape Ropatka, the Soviet forces managed to secure a beachhead 4 km wide and 5–6 km deep. The Japanese forces, who had already ceased their counterattacks, withdrew to avoid unnecessary casualties. Soviet air forces carried out intermittent night bombings. The unloading of heavy artillery, vehicles, and other bulky cargo by the Soviet forces was completed after the Japanese forces received the ceasefire orders, and artillery bombardments ceased.

Killed while silencing a Japanese machine-gun position on Shumshu on 18 August 1945, Soviet Naval Infantry Petty Officer First Class Nikolai Aleksandrovich Vilkov posthumously received the Hero of the Soviet Union award.

==== Ceasefire negotiations ====
The 91st Division headquarters had been considering sending a military emissary since the initial order to counterattack. At 3:00 PM on the 18th, Japan sent Captain Atsushi Nagashima with two attendants and ten guards as military emissaries. They advanced under a white flag, issuing ceasefire instructions to various strongholds while navigating through the fog. According to Nagashima's memoirs, some Japanese soldiers, enraged by the ceasefire negotiations, attempted to hinder the emissary's efforts. Initially, Nagashima and his party rode light tanks with white flags, but combat continued, and tanks, which were vulnerable to targeting, had to turn their turrets backward to avoid drawing attention. Eventually, they dismounted and proceeded on foot. Despite these precautions, the gunfire from both sides did not cease. Many, including the assigned interpreter, were shot or scattered, and the white flags were torn to pieces. Fearing that a large number of people might be perceived as an attacking force, Captain Nagashima sent many back and proceeded alone or with only a few companions. Both accounts mention an officer and a soldier, and it is possible that two soldiers rejoined Nagashima's group after the separation. However, they were detained by Soviet forces, and no communication between the two sides was established that day.

Upon receiving Kinoshita's report, the headquarters sent a new emissary group, including Captain Hideo Yamada, on the morning of the 19th. This time, contact was successfully established with the Soviet forces. However, the Soviets insisted on the presence of Japan's highest commander before agreeing to negotiate. Consequently, Major General Yanagoka, the division's chief of staff, and Major General Sugino, the commander of the 73rd Infantry Brigade, were sent as a third group of emissaries. In the meeting, the Soviets demanded not only a ceasefire but also disarmament. Japan's emissaries eventually agreed to this demand. Upon hearing the report, Division Commander Tsutsumi rejected the disarmament portion, stating that he had not authorized it, and sent Yanagoka again to continue negotiations.

==== Naval battle in the Paramushiro Strait ====
On the morning of the 20th at 8:10 AM, a Soviet fleet of six ships attempted to enter the Paramushiro Strait, aiming for Kataoka Bay. The Japanese Navy's 51st Landing Force, stationed at the Shiozaki Battery on Paramushiro Island, fired warning shots with anti-aircraft guns upon discovering the Soviet fleet. In response, the Soviet fleet launched a full artillery attack, and a battle ensued. The Japanese gunners fought back, and two torpedo bombers were launched to conduct intimidation flights, prompting the Soviet fleet to retreat under a smoke screen. The Soviet fleet's minesweeper Okhotsk sustained casualties, with two killed and thirteen injured.

The Soviets claimed that their fleet's attempt to enter the strait was in accordance with the previous day's ceasefire agreement, accusing the Japanese actions of violating the ceasefire and launching a surprise attack.

==== Ceasefire and surrender ====
On the 20th, combat resumed on the ground. The Soviet forces stated that they had moved to attack due to Japan's betrayal in the Paramushiro Strait.

On the evening of the 20th, Division Commander Tsutsumi assured the Soviet forces of Japan's surrender through emissaries but continued to delay the disarmament process. On the morning of the 21st at 7:00 AM, Soviet Commander General Gnechiko, through an intermediary, delivered a final ultimatum to Tsutsumi for Japan's surrender and disarmament. At 9:00 PM on the 21st, Japan provided a response, and aboard a Soviet ship, Tsutsumi signed the Japanese surrender document. On the 23rd, Japan was disarmed under Soviet supervision.

== Conclusion of operation ==
In a series of attacks during the night of 18–19 August 1945, the Soviets wiped out most of the defenses of the Japanese shore batteries, and Gnechko made plans to bring all Japanese resistance on Shumshu to an end on 19 August. Soviet heavy artillery came ashore on the morning of 19 August, and small groups of Japanese began to surrender. At 09:00, a Japanese envoy informed the Soviets that the 91st Infantry Division had received orders from higher command to cease hostilities at 16:00.

Japanese forces on Shumshu, Paramushiro, and Onekotan signed an unconditional surrender agreement at 18:00 on 19 August 1945. However, fighting on Shumshu continued to flare up until 23 August 1945, when the last Japanese on the island finally surrendered.

== Results ==
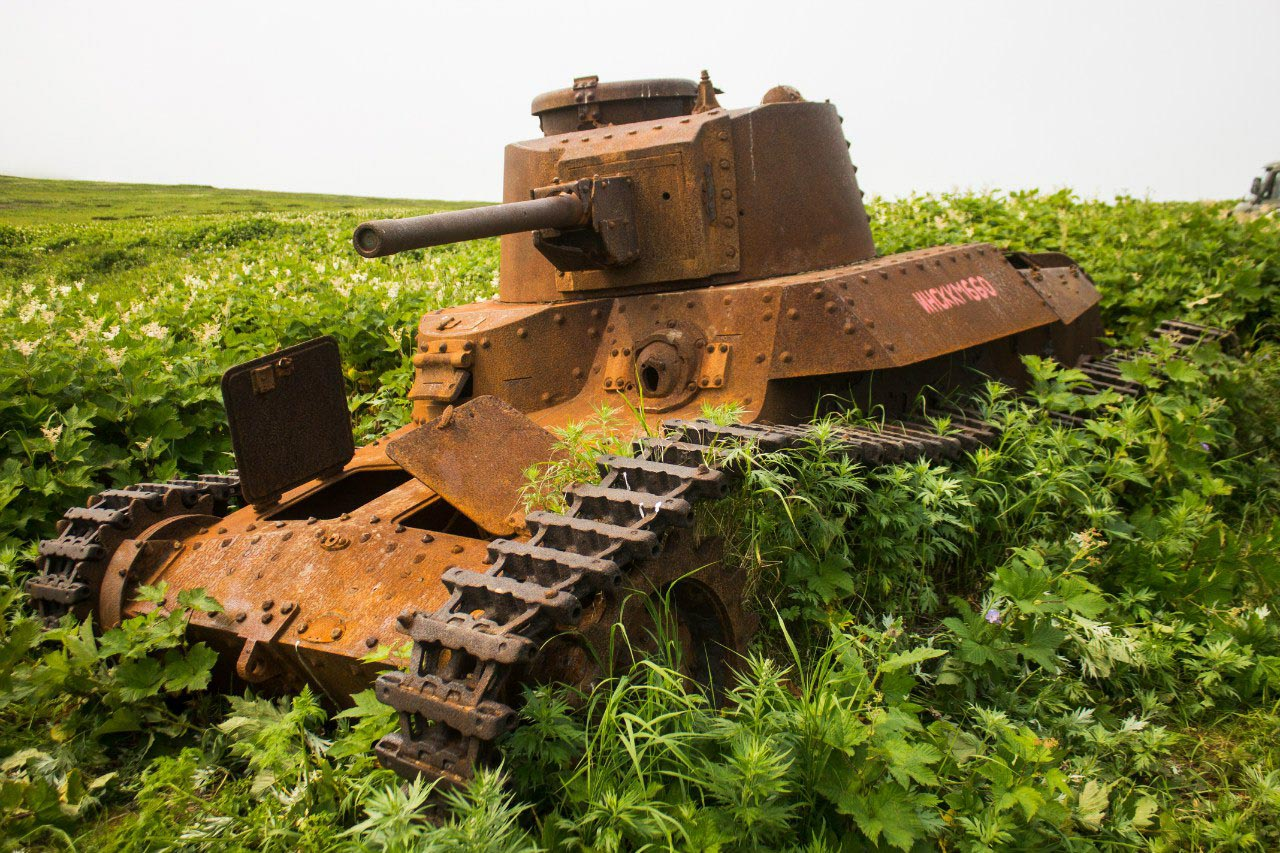
Abandoned Japanese tank

The Battle of Shumshu was the only battle between the Soviets and Japanese in August–September 1945 in which Soviet casualties exceeded those of the Japanese. The Soviets suffered 1,567 casualties – 516 killed or missing and another 1,051 wounded – and the loss of five landing ships, while Japanese casualties totaled 1,018 – 256 killed and another 762 wounded. Soviet officers later often said that the operation demonstrated the difficulty of amphibious invasions of enemy territory and Soviet shortfalls and inexperience in amphibious warfare, and cited the Soviet experience on Shumshu as a reason for not invading the island of Hokkaido in the Japanese Home Islands.

With Shumshu and Paramushiro under Soviet control, the rest of the Kuril Island chain, much more lightly held by Japanese forces, fell to Soviet forces easily. The Soviets completed their occupation of the Kurils on 5 September 1945.

== See also ==
- Soviet–Japanese War
- Soviet invasion of Manchuria
- Soviet invasion of South Sakhalin
- Project Hula
