= 91st Division (Imperial Japanese Army) =

- 第91師団
- Active: 1944–45
- Country: Empire of Japan
- Allegiance: Japan
- Branch: Imperial Japanese Army
- Type: Infantry
- Role: garrison
- Size: 23000
- Garrison/HQ: Paramushiro, Shumshu
- Nickname: Future Division
- Engagements: Invasion of the Kuril Islands; Battle of Shumshu

Commanders
- Notable commanders: Tsutsumi Fusaki

The 91st Division (第91師団, Dai-kyūjūichi Shidan) was an infantry division in the Imperial Japanese Army. Its call sign was the Future Division (先兵団, Saki Heidan). It was created on 12 April 1944 in Paramushiro. The nucleus for the formation was the 1st Kuril Islands Garrison Group. It was an oversized type C(hei) security division, with its constituent brigades consisting of six infantry battalions each from July 1944. The division had two artillery regiments, which was highly unusual.

== Basing ==
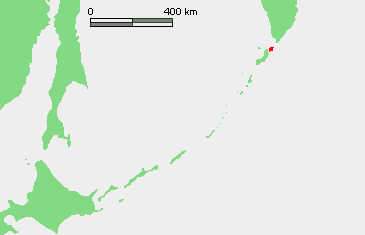
The location of Shumshu in the Kuril Islands.

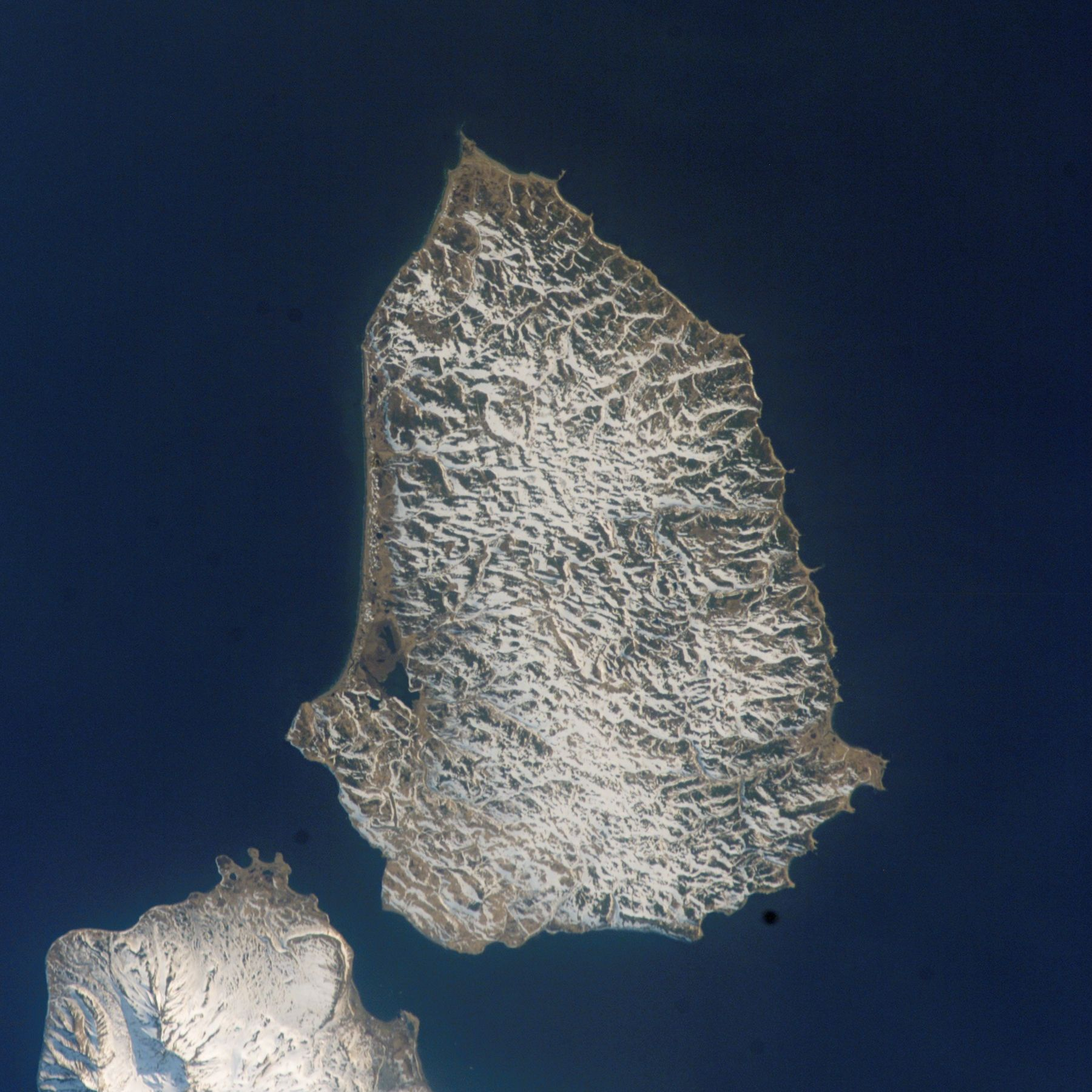
A Landsat 7 image of Shumshu. The northern tip of Paramushir (formerly Paramushiro) is at left. The First Kuril Strait lies across the upper portion of the image.

The 91st Division was assigned to the 27th Army upon formation. The division's garrison zone was Shumshu and Shiashkotan in the Kuril Islands, garrisoning Kita Chishima Fortress, with its headquarters on Shumshu, By mid-August 1945, the 91st Division had about 8,500 troops on Shumshu and another 15,000 on neighboring Paramushiro, and also fielded 77 tanks; the division's forces on the two islands could reinforce one another as necessary.

== Action ==
On 18 August 1945, the Battle of Shumshu began as part of the Soviet invasion of the Kuril Islands when 8,824 Soviet troops of two Red Army rifle divisions and a Soviet Naval Infantry battalion stormed ashore on Shumshu, the first wave landing at 0430. Taken completely by surprise, the Japanese at first mounted a disorganized defense, but by 0530 had manned machine guns in pillboxes and foxholes and began to inflict heavy casualties on the Soviets, and Japanese artillery sank five Soviet Navy landing craft when the second wave headed towards shore at 0530. When the Soviets finally mounted their first attack against Japanese coastal artillery on the heights above the beachhead at 0600, the 91st Division, which still outnumbered the Soviet forces ashore, resisted fiercely and prevented a Soviet breakthrough. The 91st Division mounted a counterattack supported by 20 tanks, but Soviet forces knocked out 15 of the tanks and then pushed up almost to the top of the heights before the Japanese stopped them. At 0910, Soviet forces on Shumshu finally established radio contact with Soviet Navy ships offshore and four Soviet 130-mm (5.1-inch) guns 12 km (7.5 statute miles) away at Cape Lopatka on the southern tip of the Kamchatka Peninsula, allowing effective Soviet artillery support to begin. The Soviet gunfire support helped the Soviet forces ashore to hold out against 91st Division counterattacks during the afternoon, and Soviet artillery fire, naval bombardments, and attacks by Soviet aircraft inflicted heavy casualties on the counterattacking Japanese.

By the evening of 18 August 1945, the Soviets had established a beachhead 4 km (2.5 mi) wide and 5 to 6 km (3.1 to 3.7 mi) deep and had finally managed to bring artillery and mortars ashore, giving the Soviets an advantage in artillery support. During the night of 18–19 August, the Soviets wiped out the 91st Division forces defending the Japanese coastal artillery sites. Soviet heavy artillery came ashore on the morning of 19 August, and small groups of Japanese began to surrender. At 0900, a Japanese envoy informed the Soviets that the 91st Infantry Division had received orders from higher command to cease hostilities at 1600 on 19 August, and Japanese forces on Shumshu, Paramushiro, and Onekotan signed an unconditional surrender agreement at 1800 on 19 August 1945.

Sporadic fighting continued to flare up on Shumshu until 23 August 1945, when the last Japanese on the island finally surrendered. The Battle of Shumshu was the only battle of the Soviet–Japanese War of August–September 1945 in which Soviet casualties exceeded those of the Japanese. The Soviets suffered 1,567 casualties — 516 killed or missing and another 1,051 wounded — and the loss of five landing ships, while Japanese casualties totaled 1,018 — 256 killed and another 762 wounded. The majority of the 91st Division was taken prisoner by Soviet forces, and these prisoners started to return to Japan in late 1946.

== See also ==
- List of Japanese Infantry Divisions
