= 89th Division (Imperial Japanese Army) =

- 第89師団
- Active: 1945 - 1945
- Country: Empire of Japan
- Allegiance: 5th area army
- Branch: Imperial Japanese Army
- Type: Infantry
- Role: internal security
- Size: 14500
- Garrison/HQ: Iturup
- Nickname: Destruction division
- Engagements: Invasion of the Kuril Islands

The 89th Division (第89師団, Dai-hachijūkyū Shidan) was an infantry division in the Imperial Japanese Army. Its call sign was the Destruction Division (摧兵団, Sai Heidan). It was created 28 February 1945 in Sapporo, by cobbling together 43rd and 69th independent mixed brigades, converted to 3rd and 4th mixed brigades, plus headquarters of the 77th division. It was an oversized (because the constituent brigades were including a six infantry battalions each since July 1944) type C(hei) security division.

== Action ==
The 89th division was assigned to the 5th area army 27 March 1945. The 3rd mixed brigade and headquarters were staying on the Iturup island, while parts of 4th mixed brigade part was garrisoning Shikotan island. Also, one battalion of the 4th mixed brigade was deployed on Kunashir Island. The 89th division has relied on heavy fortifications of Minami Chishima Fortress. After the Soviet Invasion of the Kuril Islands has started 18 August 1945, the Shikotan was invaded 1 September 1945, while Iturup garrison have surrendered 4 September 1945 without resistance, as the hostilities ceased 2 September 1945.

The majority of 89th division prisoners were returned by Soviet Union in 1948.

Japanese infantry and armored units in Home Islands, 15 August 1945

== See also ==
- List of Japanese Infantry Divisions
- Independent Mixed Brigades (Imperial Japanese Army)

== References and further reading ==
- List of Japanese Infantry Divisions
- Madej, W. Victor. Japanese Armed Forces Order of Battle, 1937-1945 [2 vols] Allentown, PA: 1981

This article incorporates material from the article 第89師団 (日本軍) in the Japanese Wikipedia, retrieved on 22 June 2016.
