= 345th Division =

345th Division may refer to:

- 345th Infantry Division, Wehrmacht, Germany
- 345th Rifle Division, Soviet Union

== See also ==
- List of military divisions by number
