= 42nd Division (Imperial Japanese Army) =

- Active: 1943 - 1945
- Country: Empire of Japan
- Branch: Imperial Japanese Army
- Type: Infantry
- Size: 20686
- Garrison/HQ: Sendai
- Nickname(s): Distinction Division
- Engagements: none

The 42nd Division (第42師団, Dai-yonjūni Shidan) was an infantry division of the Imperial Japanese Army. Its call sign was the Distinction Division (勲兵団, Isao Heidan).

The Imperial Japanese Army (IJA) 42nd Division was raised as a triangular division (type B, standard) on 1 June 1943 in Sendai, simultaneously with the 43rd, 46th and 47th divisions. It was assigned on 16 March 1944 to the 27th army. Itarkioi and Ketoebone detachments from the 42nd division had engaged in garrison duties at Simushir island (in Kuril Islands). The 12th field artillery regiment was detached from the 42nd division in May 1944.

As the 27th army was abolished 1 February 1945, the 42nd division was transferred to Hokkaido and submitted directly to the 5th area army.

In July 1945, several thousands of personnel were detached to form other military units. While digging in at Wakkanai, Hokkaido to oppose a possible Soviet invasion from Sakhalin across the La Perouse Strait, the 42nd division met the surrender of Japan 15 August 1945 without engaging in any combat, and was disbanded in September 1945.

Japanese infantry and armored units in Home Islands, 15 August 1945

== See also ==
- List of Japanese Infantry Divisions
- Independent Mixed Brigades (Imperial Japanese Army)
- Organization of Kita and Minami Fortresses

== Notes and references ==
- Madej, W. Victor. Japanese Armed Forces Order of Battle, 1937-1945 [2 vols]

Allentown, PA: 1981

- 秦郁彦編『日本陸海軍総合事典』第2版、東京大学出版会、2005年。
- 外山操・森松俊夫編著『帝国陸軍編制総覧』芙蓉書房出版、1987年。
- 示村貞夫『旭川第七師団』総北海出版部、1984年
