= Northern District Army =

- Active: December 2, 1940 – December 1, 1945
- Country: Empire of Japan
- Branch: Imperial Japanese Army
- Type: Infantry
- Role: Corps
- Garrison/HQ: Sapporo
- Engagements: Soviet invasion of Manchuria

The Northern District Army (北部軍, Hokubugun) was an army of the Imperial Japanese Army, responsible for defense of the northern region of the Japanese home islands, including Hokkaidō, Karafuto and the Chishima Islands.

== History ==
On August 1, 1935 the Japanese home territories were divided administratively into six geographical regions for the purposes of recruiting, organizing civil defense and fortifications. On December 2, 1940, the Northern Army was raised under the overall jurisdiction of the General Defense Command. 1 August 1941, the Northern Army has lost the 57th division which was sent to Manchukuo.

Primarily a garrison and training force, on February 11, 1943, the Northern Army was renamed the Northern District Army, and came under the direct command of the Imperial General Headquarters.

Towards the end of World War II, as the situation looked increasingly desperate for Japan, the Northern Area Army became the Japanese Fifth Area Army on March 10, 1944. It was reactivated as the Northern District Army on February 1, 1945 as a headquarters and administrative command, with its forces concurrent with the Japanese Fifth Area Army

== List of commanders ==
=== Commanding officers ===
	Name	From	To
1	Lieutenant General Kisaburo Hamamoto	2 December 1940	1 August 1942
2	General Kiishiro Higuchi	1 August 1942	10 March 1944
3	General Kiishiro Higuchi	1 February 1945	1 December 1945

=== Chief of staff ===
	Name	From	To
1	Lieutenant General Matsujiro Kimura	2 December 1940	10 March 1944
