= 101st Rifle Division =

- Active: 1938–1948
- Country: Soviet Union
- Branch: Red Army
- Type: Infantry; Mountain Infantry
- Size: Division
- Part of: 2nd Red Banner Army
- Engagements: World War II: Invasion of the Kuril Islands; Proposed Soviet invasion of Hokkaido
- Decorations: Order of Lenin

Commanders
- Notable commanders: Col. Ivan Pavlovich Pichugin; Maj. Gen. Semyon Fyodorovich Mozhaev; Maj. Gen. Porfirii Ivanovich Dyakov

The 101st Rifle Division was a unit of the Soviet Red Army initially formed as a mountain rifle division on 28 August 1938 within the 2nd Separate Red Banner Army in Petropavlovsk-Kamchatsky city.

== History ==
Initially the division included the 138th Rifle Regiment formed in 1938 from the 292nd Rifle Regiment of the Pacific Ocean Fleet, which had been created in 1937 from the 10th Separate Territorial Rifle Battalion of the 4th Bashkir Regiment. In 1940, the division was removed from the roll of first line formations. According to the Soviet General Staff order of battle study it was converted to a regular rifle division in December 1941 but the Personnel Department's list of commanders shows it as a rifle division from October 1940 to the end of the war. It remained on Sakhalin Island for the duration of the war, apart from the Soviet invasion of Manchuria.

In 1943 the HQ of the 101st division included: the 128th Mixed Aviation Division, Petropavlovsk Military Naval Base, border security detachment, the 428th howitzer artillery regiment, the 302nd Separate Rifle Regiment, three separate artillery divisions (battalions), the 5th Separate Rifle Battalion, and a number of storage facilities. From 15 January 1945 the division was included in the composition of the Northern Group of Forces of the Far Eastern Front and subordinated to the Kamchatka Defense Area of the Front (Russian: Камчатский Оборонительный район (КОР) ДВФ). It was still in this formation as of 3 September.

For exemplary fulfillment of assignments and displaying combat mastery during the taking of the islands Shumshu and Paramushir in the course of the Kuril Landing operation, the Presidium of the Supreme Soviet of the USSR, declared by order of NKO No. 0164, the division was awarded the Order of Lenin on 14 September 1945.

The division became part of the 137th Rifle Corps postwar at Paramushir. In 1948 it was converted into the 6th Machine Gun Artillery Division. The division was disbanded in 1953, following the 1952 Severo-Kurilsk tsunami.

== August 1945 Order of Battle ==
In August 1945 the composition of the 101st rifle division was:

Headquarters and Staff
- KAD (Commander of artillery division) command platoon
- SMERSH detachment
- Infantry training battalion
- 169th Anti-Tank Battalion
- 119th Sapper Battalion
- 103rd Signals Battalion
- 131st Medical Battalion
- 38th Chemical Defence Company
- 70th Field post office
- Divisional sewing repair shop
- Anti-aircraft machine gun company
- 13th Mobile field hospital
- 178th Divisional veterinary infirmary
- 9th Field Bakery
- Armored train, 19th cavalry squadron
- 138th Rifle Regiment
- 302nd Rifle Regiment
- 373rd Rifle Regiment
- 279th Artillery Regiment(Light)

== Commanders ==
The following officers commanded the division.

- Major (from 21 September 1940 brigade commander) Aksenty Gorodnyansky (August 1938 – 25 October 1940)
- Colonel (from 2 January 1942 Major General) Ivan Pichugin (25 October 1940 – 27 June 1942)
- Major General Semyon Mozhaev (27 June 1942 – 22 September 1943)
- Major General Porfiry Dyakov (22 September 1943 – 4 November 1945).

== Awards ==
Order of Lenin – Awarded on 14 September 1945.
