= Proposed Soviet invasion of Hokkaido =

Soviet plans made to invade Hokkaido, Japan in August 1945

- Part of the Soviet–Japanese War of World War II
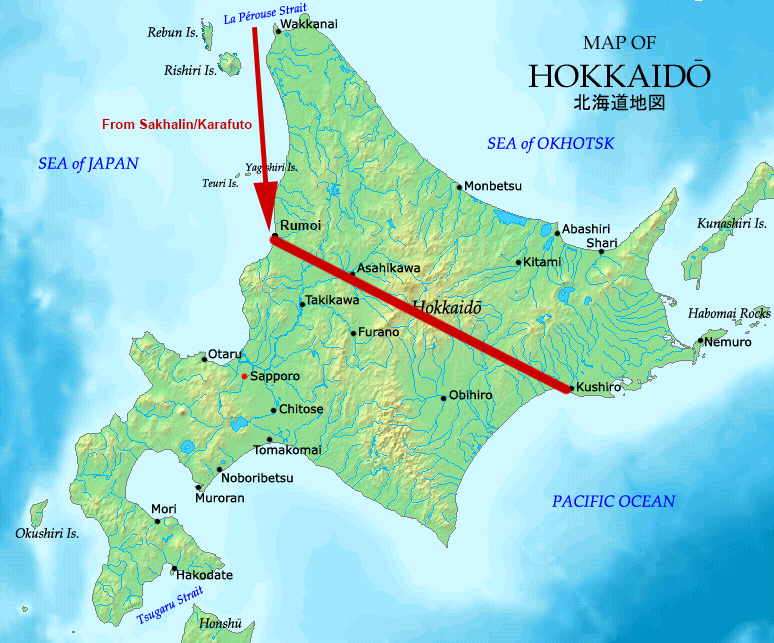
- Proposed invasion plan for Soviet invasion of Hokkaido in 1945 during World War II. The Soviet Union planned to land at Rumoi and occupy the island north of a line between Rumoi and Kushiro.
Date	24 August 1945 (planned start)
Location	Hokkaido
Result	Canceled on 22 August 1945

Belligerents
Soviet Union	Japan

Commanders and leaders
Aleksandr Vasilevsky; Alexander Novikov; Ivan Yumashev	Kiichiro Higuchi; Saburo Hagi

Units involved
2nd Far Eastern Front; 16th Army; Two divisions of the 87th Rifle Corps (initially); 342nd Rifle Division; 345th Rifle Division; 355th Rifle Division; 79th Rifle Division; 101st Rifle Division; Pacific Fleet	Fifth Area Army; 7th Division; 42nd Division; 101st Independent Mixed Brigade; 22nd Tank Regiment; 1st Air Division; 20th Air Brigade; Imperial Japanese Navy; 12th Air Fleet; Volunteer Fighting Corps

During the Soviet–Japanese War in August 1945, the Soviet Union made plans to invade Hokkaido, the northernmost of Japan's four main home islands. Opposition from the United States and doubts within the Soviet high command caused the plans to be canceled before the invasion could begin.

== Background ==
In the final days of World War II, the Soviet Union declared war on Japan (9 August), just as Joseph Stalin had secretly agreed at Tehran and Yalta. The Soviet declaration of war was a major factor in the surrender of Japan on 15 August. Although all other Allies, including the United States, ceased all hostilities upon the surrender, Stalin ordered his troops to continue fighting to capture more Japanese territory and to put the Soviets in a stronger bargaining position for influencing the post-war future of the region.

During their planning of the conquests of Sakhalin and the Kurils, the Soviets considered it necessary to control Hokkaido (or at least the parts of Hokkaido bordering the Sea of Okhotsk) to secure their new territories. However, the previous month's Potsdam Declaration set out that postwar Japan would control its four main home islands of Hokkaido, Honshu, Kyushu, and Shikoku. Therefore, a Soviet annexation or even occupation of Hokkaido would have likely provoked heated opposition from the other Allies.

In June 1945, Stalin consulted Marshal Georgy Zhukov on the possibility of invading Hokkaido. Some sources claim that Zhukov estimated it would take four field armies (each consisting of approximately 3-5 divisions) to conquer the whole of Hokkaido. American historian Dennis Giangreco dismisses this as inaccurate, writing that this "by all Soviet standards, was clearly excessive" and that "The force ultimately assembled for the amphibious operation matched Zhukov's recommendations." Giangreco maintains that Zhukov actually thought that an invasion would necessitate a much smaller force of four rifle divisions.

== Proposed battle plans ==
Marshal of the Soviet Union Aleksandr Vasilevsky envisioned taking the northern half of Hokkaido by landing at the small, remote port of Rumoi and occupying everything north of a line from Rumoi to Kushiro. Two rifle divisions of the 87th Rifle Corps were procured for the initial phase of the operation while a third was to arrive later to assist with the rest of the island. Air and sea units were also sent to Sakhalin to support the invasion. Even with American ships lent to the Soviets during Project Hula, the Soviet Navy did not have enough transport space to carry both divisions from Sakhalin in one lift and so it planned to make two trips. Admiral Ivan Yumashev planned to start the Rumoi landing at 05:00 on 24 August.

The Soviet high command dictated that although logistical preparations should go forward, the invasion should not begin without explicit authorization from headquarters.

== Cancelation ==
US President Harry Truman was willing to accept the Soviet annexation of Sakhalin and the Kuril Islands, which remained part of the Soviet Union after the war, but he staunchly opposed any Soviet escapade on Hokkaido. The Potsdam Declaration intended for all of the Japanese home islands to be surrendered to US General Douglas MacArthur, rather than to the Soviets and so Truman refused to allow the Soviets to participate in the occupation of Japan. Furthermore, concerns were raised within the Soviet high command that an invasion of Hokkaido would be impractical, be unlikely to succeed, and violate the Yalta Agreement.

The invasion was cancelled on 22 August, two days before their scheduled start, and Soviet forces concentrated on taking the Kuril Islands instead.

== Historical analysis ==
Historians have generally considered it unlikely that an invasion of Hokkaido would have succeeded. Factors include the small number of Soviet transport ships, the small number of Soviet ground forces planned for the invasion, and the availability of Japanese air power including kamikaze planes to contest a Soviet landing. Soviet forces suffered heavy losses in the Battle of Shumshu during the invasion of the Kuril Islands, and historians foresaw similar problems plaguing an invasion of Hokkaido.

Historian Dennis Giangreco argues that Stalin was forced to cancel the invasion due to both political and logistic limitations. Such an operation would have been interpreted as a violation of the Yalta Agreement and thus risked immediate confrontation with the United States. The naval side of the invasion, by Giangreco's assessment, "was not possible for at least a year if ever," and the aerial dimension also faced significant constraints. Furthermore, the Japanese possessed significant defensive positions which, in connection with the massive reserve of Japanese forces and the cessation of hostilities with the US, would have enabled them to wage a slow and grueling war of attrition reminiscent of Dien Bien Phu. The Red Army could scarcely allocate three divisions to the operation, and their entire plan rested on the assumption that they would not face significant resistance taking Hokkaido due to Japan having formally surrendered—an assumption challenged by the Battle of Shumshu. Thus, Giangreco concludes, "If Imperial forces subsequently put up even modest opposition," then a successful Soviet invasion would have been almost certainly impossible.

Richard B. Frank, however, believes that despite serious Soviet deficiencies in shipping capacity and air cover, the Soviets could have succeeded because Japanese defenses were concentrated in the south to face the Americans, rather than the north to face the Soviets.

== See also ==
- Japanese evacuation of Karafuto and the Kuril Islands
- Operation Downfall, the American-led plans to invade Japan
- Proposed Japanese invasion of Australia during World War II
- The Place Promised in Our Early Days
