= 345th Rifle Division =

345th Rifle Division (September 9, 1941 – July 17, 1942) 345th Rifle Division (March 13, 1945 – 1946)
- Active: 1941–1946
- Country: Soviet Union
- Branch: Red Army
- Type: Division
- Role: Infantry
- Engagements: Crimean Campaign; Siege of Sevastopol (1941–42); Soviet invasion of Manchuria; Proposed Soviet invasion of Hokkaido

Commanders
- Notable commanders: Col. Nikolai Olimpievich Guz; Col. Vasilii Vasilievich Pyankov

The 345th Rifle Division began forming in September, 1941, as a standard Red Army rifle division, at Makhachkala on the Caspian Sea. Its first formation served exclusively in the southernmost parts of the Soviet-German front, specifically in the Caucasus and Crimea. It arrived at Sevastopol in December, and fought stubbornly in defense of the fortress-port until mid-July, 1942, when the city capitulated and the division was destroyed. In March, 1945, a new 345th was formed in the Far East, and a few months later took part in the Soviet invasion of Manchuria in August, but as it was in a reserve formation it saw little, if any, actual combat.

== 1st Formation ==
The division formed for the first time on September 9, 1941, at Makhachkala in the North Caucasus Military District. Just before it was sent to the front, its personnel were noted as being 38 percent Russian, with the remaining 62 percent Central Asian and Caucasian; most of the Caucasian troops were Ossetians and Chechens. Its order of battle was as follows:

- 1163rd Rifle Regiment
- 1165th Rifle Regiment
- 1167th Rifle Regiment
- 905th Artillery Regiment
- 629th Antiaircraft Battalion
- 622nd Sapper Battalion
- 793rd Signal Battalion
- 404th Reconnaissance Company

The absence of an antitank battalion is notable. Even when it shipped out to Sevastopol it only had six such guns on hand. Col. Nikolai Olimpievich Guz took command of the division on the day it was formed and he remained in command until the first formation was dissolved. The unit had about three months to form up far from the front before going into action. In late December it moved to the Georgian Black Sea port of Poti. As of December 20, the division had the following strengths (actual on hand/Official Shtat):

- Officers, NCOs, men - 11,279/11,434
- Rifles (inc. semi-auto.) - 7,131/8,666
- Submachine guns - 0/622
- Machine guns (all types) - 165/180
- 76mm artillery - 21/28
- 45mm antitank guns - 6/18
- 122mm howitzers - 13/8
- Mortars of all calibres - 93/162
- Radios - 25/31
- Horses - 2,295/2,510
- Motor transport - 139/216

The division was not badly off for manpower, and was over-strength in howitzers, but was lacking in weapons in general and especially modern weapons. It had less than a tenth of the semi-automatic rifles it should have, and no submachine guns, anti-aircraft machine guns, or 37mm anti-aircraft guns at all, just six antitank guns, and 107mm mountain mortars were substituted for 120mm mortars, and only at 75 percent strength. However, many other rifle divisions went to the front in equal or worse shape in that month.

=== Siege of Sevastopol ===
In mid-December, German 11th Army, under command of General Erich von Manstein, began its first deliberate assault on the Sevastopol defenses. During a brief halt in this offensive, on December 23, a five-ship convoy carrying the 345th was escorted into the port, where it joined the Separate Coastal Army, under command of General I. Ye. Petrov; it would remain under these commands for the duration of the siege. It had been intended to land the division near Kerch along with the 302nd Mountain Rifle Division, but the crisis at Sevastopol forced the change in plans. The fresh troops were immediately ordered into the line to replace the 388th Rifle Division, which had been shattered in the earlier fighting.

Manstein ordered an all-out attack on December 24, attempting to crack the boundary of Soviet defense sectors III and IV, in the area of Mekenzievy Mountain, south of the Belbek River. The Soviet reinforcements came as a rude surprise; the five attacking battalions of the 132nd Infantry Division ran up against one of the division's rifle regiments and were thrown back. On Christmas Day, the 1165th Rifle Regiment, with the T-26 tanks of the 81st Tank Battalion, which had landed with the division, supported by the 8th Marine Rifle Brigade, two artillery regiments, the armored train Zhelezniakov, and three Soviet destroyers in the Black Sea, launched a counter-attack, which developed into a see-saw affair with no major breakthroughs occurring. The landings at Kerch began at dawn on December 26, which indirectly forced the German units at Sevastopol to scale back their attacks. on December 27, 8th Marine Brigade was relieved in the line by two battalions of 1165th Rifle Regiment. German 22nd Infantry Division attacked near Mekenzievy Railway Station; they were temporarily held back by mortar fire, but then broke through at the junction of the 1165th and 1163rd Regiments. This attack was again stalled by artillery and mortar fire. The Germans then used rocket artillery to penetrate to the third defense line, and after heavy fighting they captured the rail station.

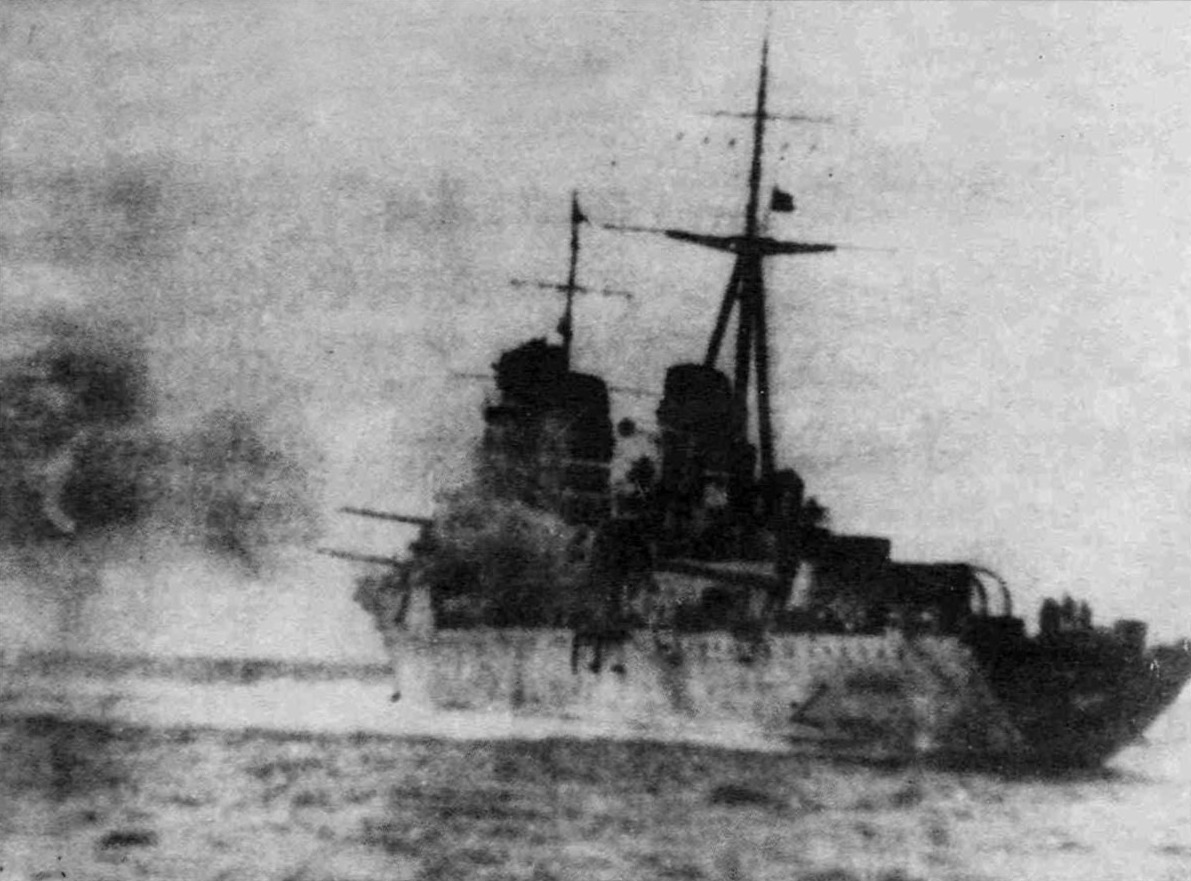
Molotov firing

On December 29, the 345th, along with the 79th Rifle Brigade, attacked Mekenzievy Station. The battleship Parizhskaya Kommuna, the cruiser Molotov, plus destroyers and minesweepers, fired over a thousand heavy- and medium-calibre shells in support. These caused heavy losses to German vehicles and personnel. The Soviet infantry attack met with initial success but by evening the Germans were once again in control of the station. On the following day, during intense combat, the station changed hands twice. In the afternoon the Germans attacked 1165th Regiment, gaining 400 metres of territory south of the station. By the end of the day the attacks stopped. On December 31, the division reported it had about 2,000 front-line infantry remaining. On the same day, German 11th Army made its final attempt in this phase of the siege to capture antiaircraft battery 365, known to the Germans as Fort Stalin. A preemptive Soviet artillery bombardment at dawn forced back the German timetable by two hours. At 1000 hrs., two battalions from the 22nd Infantry, with six StuG III assault guns in support, attacked the center and right flank of the 345th. This attack was repulsed. At 1235 hrs. two fresh German battalions were brought in to the attack, but the division held its ground. At 1800 hrs. the 8th Marine Rifle Brigade, and two regiments of the 95th Rifle Division, attacked into the Belbek valley to relieve pressure on the 345th. The day ended with the Red Army still in control of AA Battery 365, the German objective on this sector, and at the end of the day their assault was shut down.

This phase of the siege ended, in part, because General Erik Hansen, commander of the German LIV Army Corps, was ordered to release his 132nd and 170th Infantry Divisions to counter the Soviet landings at Feodosiya. Consequently, the German forces had to give up the area around Mekenzievy Station, which was reoccupied by the division. The siege then settled into a relative lull over the next several weeks. On February 26, 1942, General Petrov ordered a large attack against the 24th Infantry Division's positions near Mekenzievy Mountain using the 345th, the 2nd and 3rd Naval Infantry Regiments, and the 125th Tank Battalion. The Germans were taken by surprise by the scale of the attack and the Soviet troops were able to advance about 1,300 metres into the German lines before being stopped by a counterattack. Intermittent fighting continued in this area until March 6, which cost the German division 1,277 casualties, including 288 dead or missing. Petrov's assault forces suffered much higher losses, with 1,818 dead and 780 captured. The 345th suffered a large portion of these casualties, when on March 2, during a counterattack near Mekenzievy Farm, German troops slipped into a gap between 79th Marine Brigade and 1163rd Rifle Regiment and got into the regiment's rear, putting the entire division into a very dangerous situation. Some companies were isolated and had to make their ways back through thick woods and deep gorges, and many men were lost. As a result, the 1167th Regiment was temporarily disbanded to provide replacements for the other two. The fortress garrison went back to the defensive. During the spring, antiaircraft guns that were intended for the division were lost at sea.

=== Operation Sturgeon Haul ===
When the third German assault began on June 7, the somewhat rebuilt 345th, at Mekenzievy Station, was the only reserve Petrov had to back up the defenders in sectors III and IV. Overnight on June 8–9 it moved up to help form a new defensive line behind sector IV. The 1167th Regiment was stationed near Battery 365, while on the following day the 1163rd was behind the railway station and the 1165th joined with the remnant of the 79th Marines. These last two regiments once again faced the 22nd Infantry Division, with about 16 remaining StuG IIIs and a few captured tanks in support. After a heavy pounding by artillery the men of the 1163rd were overwhelmed, with 120 taken prisoner, and the railway station fell once again. Colonel Guz ordered the 1165th (Lt. Col. V.V. Babkov) to retake the station but at the end of the day it was still firmly in German hands.

Around 1000 hrs. on June 12 the Germans dealt a major blow in the vicinity of the station; faced with an attack led by captured KV-1 heavy tanks, the defenders broke and ran. The Germans advanced to about 1 km south of the station, and the Soviets had now lost the eastern flank of the ridge running towards Battery 365. A scratch force of men from the 345th, 25th Rifle Division, and 79th Marines, established a new line of defense. On the 13th, Battery 365 fell. By June 15, the division had about 900 men remaining. General Petrov planned for a counterattack on June 18 with the 345th, the newly arrived 138th Rifle Brigade, and remnants of 95th Rifle Division; at this time the division was defending the Grafskaya Ravine. After a short artillery preparation, the attack stepped off at 0500 hrs., supported by the last three tanks of the 125th Tank Battalion, towards Mekenzievy Station, but German reserves drove them back to their original positions.

Following additional German gains over the next three days, General Petrov ordered all remaining Soviet forces to evacuate the north side of Severnaya Bay as the enemy reached the shoreline on June 22. Defense sector IV had fallen and all that remained of sector III were the remnants of the division and the 138th Brigade holding on to the Serpentine tunnel and Martynovsky Ravine at the bay's northeast corner. Two platoon leaders of the 138th deserted to the Germans and gave information on the strength and dispositions of the remaining Soviet troops. A carefully planned attack on June 22 by 50th Infantry Division overran the Serpentine and reached the railway tunnel, which was cleared with flamethrowers. Heavy fighting continued around the ravine on the 23rd, but the disorganized Soviet units were defeated piecemeal, with at least 725 men captured. Perhaps as many as 4,000 men escaped southward to Inkerman, but nearly all the remaining men and women of the 345th were trapped north of the bay and overrun. On July 4 the battle for Sevastopol ended, and the 345th Rifle Division was officially disbanded on July 17.

== 2nd Formation ==
Very late in the war, on March 13, 1945, the 345th was formed again, this time in the 2nd Red Banner Army of the Far Eastern Front, near Khabarovsk. It and the 2nd formation of the 396th Rifle Division were the last two regular rifle divisions formed during the war. Its order of battle remained the same as the first formation. Lt. Col. Vasilii Vasilievich Pyankov was assigned to command the division on the day it was formed; a week later he was promoted to Colonel. After just a few months the division was assigned to the 87th Rifle Corps in the 1st Far Eastern Front reserves, and served under those commands during the Soviet invasion of Manchuria in August. During the initial stages of the offensive the 345th, with its Corps, advanced deep into enemy-held territory, although the division saw little, if any actual combat. The division was slated to participate in the proposed Soviet invasion of Hokkaido before it was cancelled. The 345th was disbanded in September by the order establishing the Primorsky Military District and the Far Eastern Military District.
