= Dmitry Ponomarev (submariner) =

Dmitry Grigorievich Ponomarev
- Дмитрий Григорьевич Пономарёв
- Born: 3 November 1908; Arkhangelsk, Russian Empire
- Died: 26 December 1982 (aged 74); Leningrad, Soviet Union
- Military career
- Allegiance: Soviet Union (from 1929)
- Service years: 1930–1954
- Rank: Captain 1st rank
- Commands: Petropavlovsk naval base of Pacific fleet
- Conflicts: World War II; Soviet–Japanese War
- Awards: Hero of the Soviet Union

Dmitry Grigorievich Ponomarev (Russian: Дмитрий Григорьевич Пономарёв; 3 November 1908 – 26 December 1982) was a Soviet submarine commander who was awarded the title Hero of the Soviet Union for actions in the Soviet-Japanese War.

== Biography ==
Born in a working class family in Arkhangelsk, Dmitry graduated from the Arkhangelsk naval college (after named as Admiral Makarov State Maritime Academy) in 1929, and started as a sailing-master on merchant vessel. In 1930, he joined the Red Army where he served until 1931. From 1933 to 1935, he was a student of educational detachment of diving named by Sergey Kirov. In 1935 he started off as an assistant to the commander of submarine of Pacific Fleet, later becoming the submarine commander himself (33rd division and 31st division of submarines in 1939).

Since 1940, he was a commander of the Petropavlovsk naval base of Pacific Fleet. Dmitry was a participant in the Soviet–Japanese War in 1945. During the Invasion of the Kuril Islands, he prepared, and in difficult weather conditions, accomplished a transition by the sea, executed landing operation to fortified islands of Shusha and Paramushir, and organized a neutralization of enemy's strong points and weapon placements. For the successful realization of this operation, he was given the rank of the Hero of the Soviet Union. After that, he continued his service to the navy. In 1948, Ponomarev ended the academic courses. Since 1954, he lived in Leningrad, and died in 1982.

== Awards ==
- Hero of the Soviet Union
- Order of Lenin
- Order of the Red Banner
- Order of the Patriotic War 1st class
- Two Orders of Red Star
