= Fusaki Tsutsumi =

Japanese general

- 堤 不夾貴
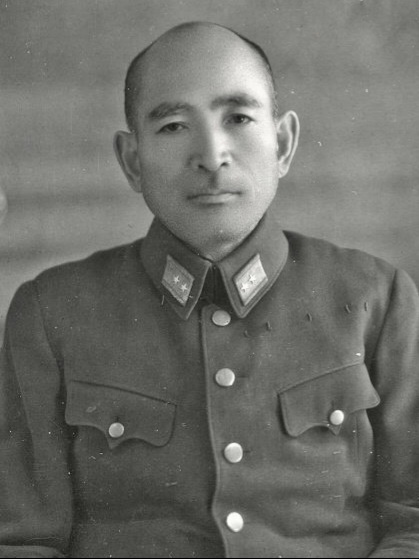
- Born: March 3, 1890; Kofu, Yamanashi, Japan
- Died: July 29, 1959 (aged 69)
- Military career
- Allegiance: Empire of Japan
- Branch: Imperial Japanese Army
- Service years: 1922―1945
- Rank: Lieutenant General
- Unit: 10th Infantry Division
- Commands: 91st Infantry Division
- Conflicts: Invasion of Manchuria; Second Sino-Japanese War; World War II; Invasion of the Kuril Islands; Battle of Shumshu

Fusaki Tsutsumi (堤 不夾貴, Tsutsumi Fusaki; March 3, 1890 – July 21, 1959) was a career military officer and a lieutenant-general of the Imperial Japanese Army in World War II.

== Life ==
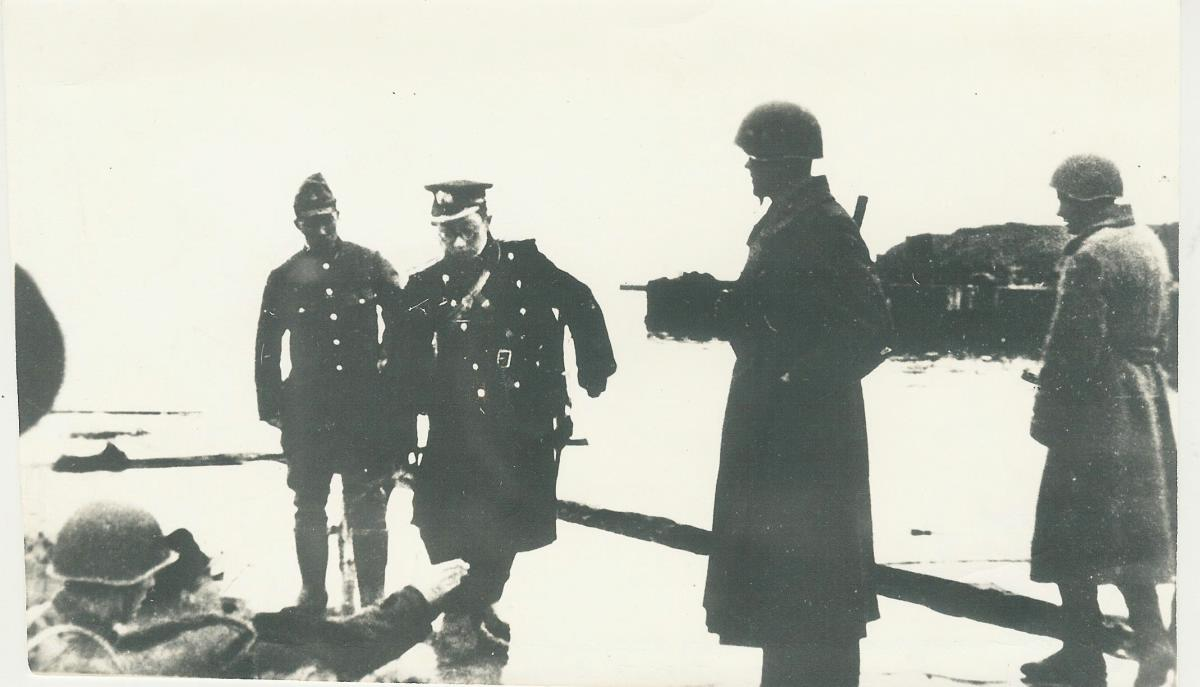
Lieutenant General Tsutsumi Fusaki, arriving to negotiate the surrender of the garrisons of the north-Kuril Islands

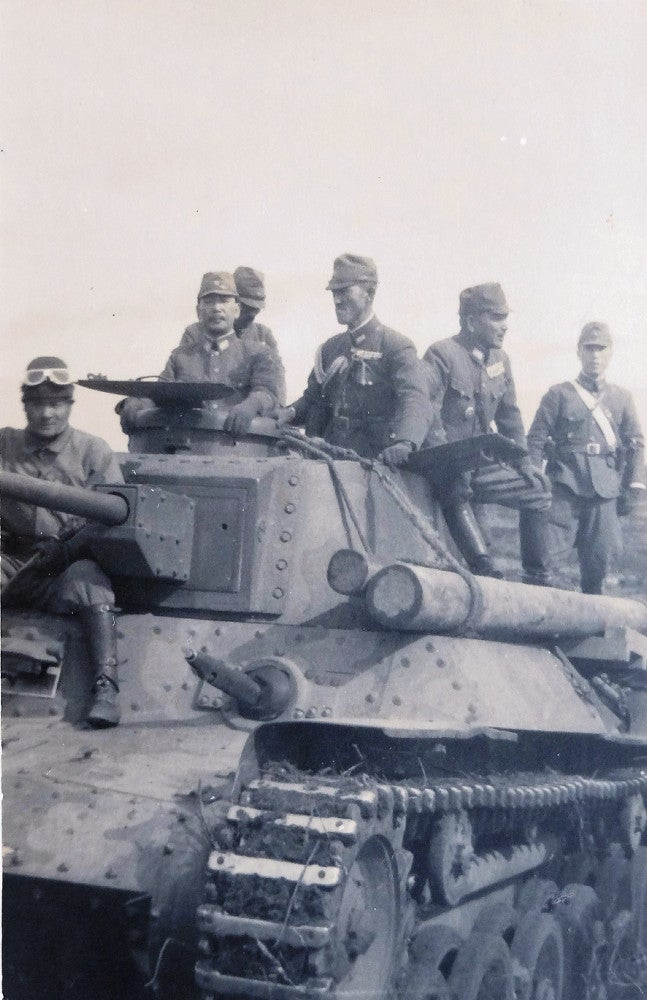
Tsutsumi Fusaki and his staff in 1945

Born in the city of Kofu, Yamanashi Prefecture, Tsutsumi graduated from the Imperial Japanese Army Academy in 1922.

He took part in the invasion of Manchuria as Chief of Staff of the 10th Infantry Division. The division was deployed to the Asian continent during the Mukden Incident in September 1931 and remained stationed in Manchuria afterwards, participating in the Jinzhou Operation of 1932. The division returned to Japan in March 1934.

In October 1943, he was assigned command of the Japanese defenses of the Kuril Islands. In April 1944, he formed the 91st Infantry Division. He led the defense of the northern Kuril islands during the Kuril landing operation and the Battle of Shumshu. On August 23, 1945, he signed the terms to surrender his troops to the invading Soviet Union.
