= Shumshu =

Easternmost island of the Kuril Island chain

Native name: Шумшу (Russian); 占守島 (Japanese); スㇺス (Ainu)
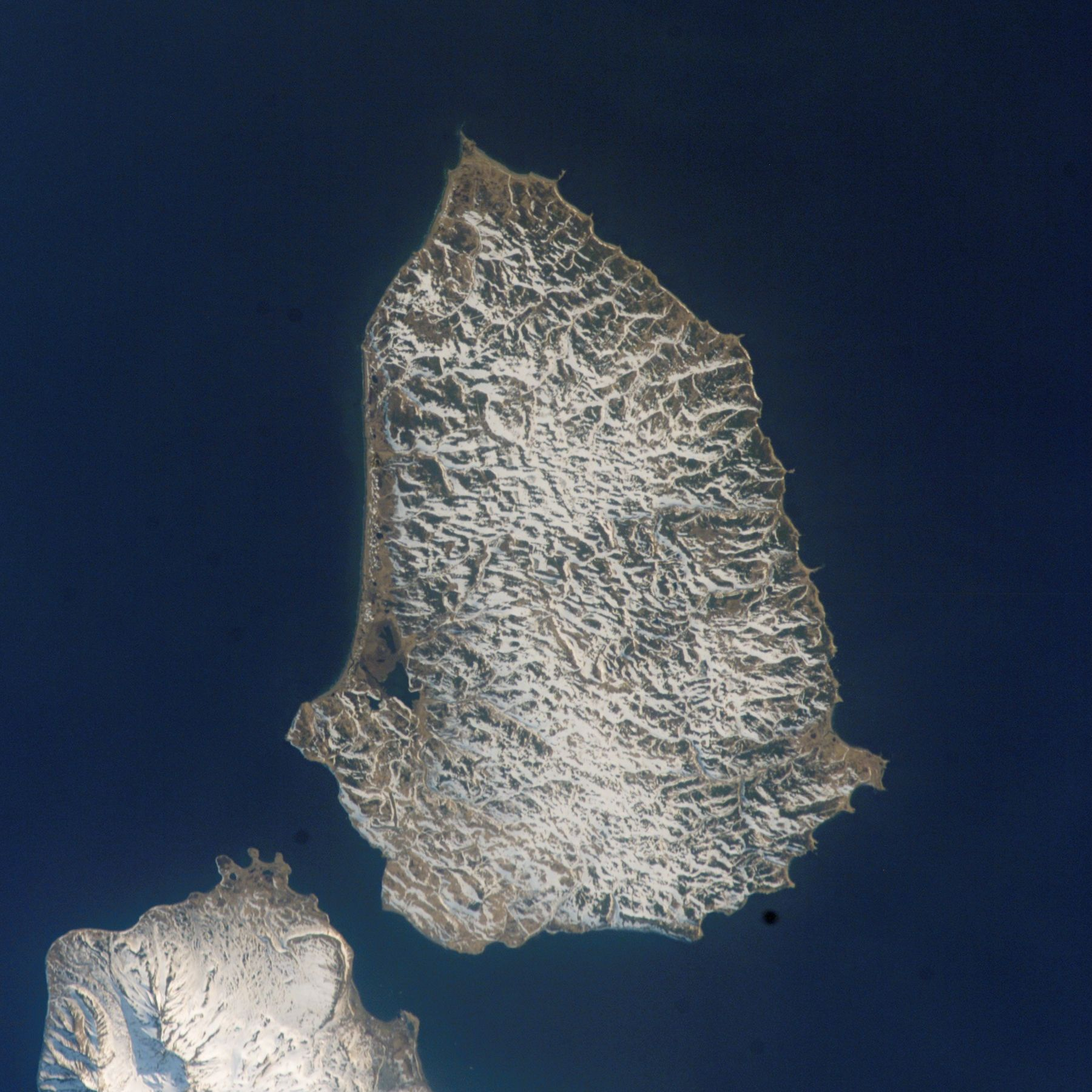
- A Landsat 7 image of Shumshu Island. The northern tip of Paramushir Island is to the bottom left. The First Kuril Strait lies across the upper portion of the image.

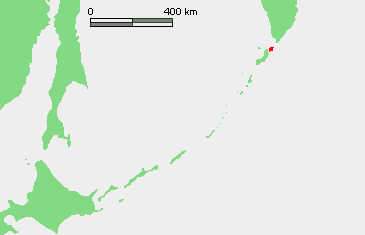

- Location within Sakhalin Oblast
- Interactive map of Shumshu

Geography
- Location: Pacific Ocean
- Coordinates: 50°44′N 156°19′E
- Archipelago: Kuril Islands
- Area: 388 km^{2} (150 sq mi)
- Length: 28 km (17.4 mi)
- Width: 15 km (9.3 mi)
- Highest elevation: 171 m (561 ft)

Administration
- Russia
- Oblast: Sakhalin Oblast
- District: Severo-Kurilsky

Demographics
- Population: ± 100 (seasonal)

Shumshu (Russian: Шумшу; Japanese: 占守島, romanized: Shumushu-tō; Ainu: スㇺス, lit. 'good island') is the easternmost and second-northernmost island of the Kuril Islands chain, which divides the Sea of Okhotsk from the northwest Pacific Ocean. The name of the island is derived from the Ainu language, meaning "good island". It is separated from Paramushir by the very narrow Second Kuril Strait in the northeast 2.5 kilometres (1.6 mi), and its northern tip is 11 kilometres (6.8 mi), from Cape Lopatka at the southern tip of the Kamchatka Peninsula. The island has a seasonal population of around 100 inhabitants.

== Geography ==
Shumshu is the least elevated in the entire Kuril group with a height of 189 metres (620 feet). The terrain is low-lying and covered with numerous lakes and marshland. Shumshu is roughly oval, and has an area of 388 square kilometres (150 square miles).

=== Main Features ===
- Ozero Utinoye (lake)
- Ozero Dogovoye (lake)
- Ozero Kuzminovskoye (lake)
- Ozero Bol'shoye (lake)
- Bukhta Shumnaya (bay)
- Bukhta Sakulina (bay)
- Bukhta Inozemtseva (bay)
- Bukhta Mayachnaya (bay)
- Nakagawa-wan (bay)
- Katoka-wan (bay)

== History ==
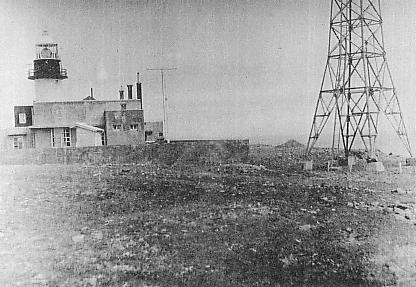
Kokutanzaki Lighthouse on Shumshu, before 1945

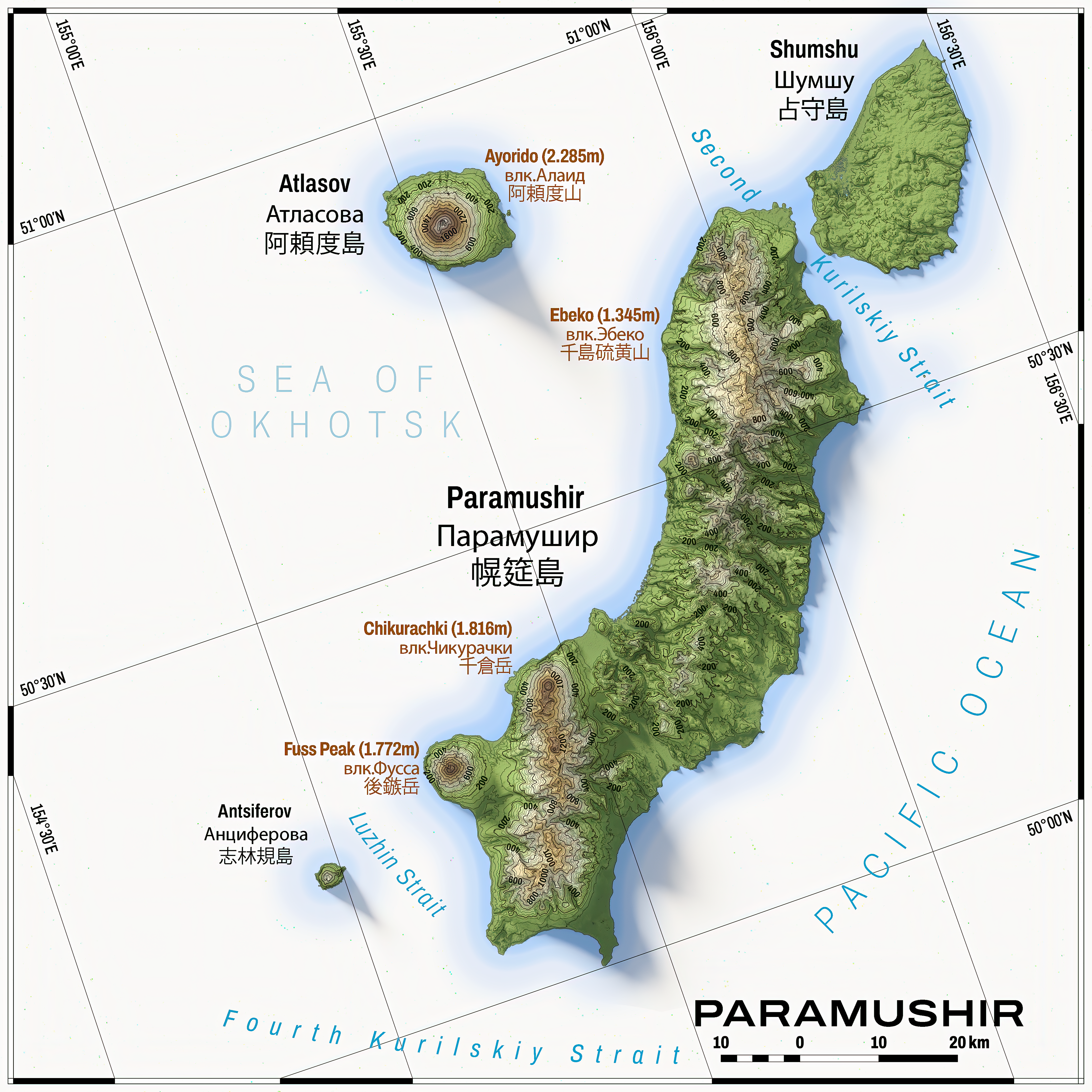
Map showing the position of Shumshu relatively to its neighboring islands

Shumshu was inhabited by the Ainu, who subsisted off of the abundant fish, marine mammals and birdlife in the area, at the time of European contact. The island appears on an official map showing the territories of Matsumae Domain, a feudal domain of Edo-period Japan dated 1644. Due to its proximity to the Kamchatka Peninsula, Shumshu became the first of the Kurils to be reached by Cossacks from the peninsula in the first years of the 18th century. Russian fur traders are known to have visited the island in 1711 and 1713, and it was from this base that Russian fur hunters and traders gradually expanded into other islands of the chain and Sakhalin. Although the Tokugawa shogunate of Japan officially confirmed the Matsumae Domain’s claims to the island, the island remained outside of de facto Japanese control. Also claimed by the Empire of Russia, sovereignty over the island was confirmed to be under Russia under the terms of the Treaty of Shimoda in 1855. In 1875, sovereignty over the Kuril Islands, including Shumshu, was transferred to the Empire of Japan per the Treaty of Saint Petersburg. A number of Japanese colonizing expeditions followed, establishing the settlement of Kataoka (on the site of the Ainu settlement of Mairuppo) as the commercial center of Shumshu. As the island closest to Russia, it became an important Japanese military outpost, as well as a center for the commercial fishing industry. The island was administered as part of the Shumushu District of Nemuro Subprefecture of Hokkaidō. In 1910, a cannery was established, and the island’s civilian population exceeded 2,000 by the early 1940s.

Towards the end of World War II the island was strongly garrisoned by both the Imperial Japanese Army (IJA) and Imperial Japanese Navy (IJN). A garrison of over 24,500 men reinforced by sixty tanks was garrisoned on Shumshu in nine locations centered around Kataoka. All coastal areas suitable for enemy amphibious landings were covered with permanent emplacements and bunkers, interconnected with underground passages and trenches. All the warehouses, power stations, and hospitals were up to 50 metres (164 ft) underground. These defenses were manned by the IJA 91st Division, with the IJA 73rd Infantry Brigade. Miyoshino Airfield was a joint IJA-IJN airfield, located near the center of the island, and it hosted several aviation units operating various aircraft including IJN Nakajima B5N2 (Allied reporting name "Kate") and Mitsubishi G3M (Allied reporting name "Nell") and IJA Nakajima Ki-44 (Allied reporting name "Tojo") and Nakajima Ki-43 (Allied reporting name "Oscar") aircraft. Kataoka Naval Base was under the command of the IJN′s 5th Fleet and had three 60-foot (18.3 m) oil storage tanks as well as barracks and supply buildings. The base also had a seaplane facility in the harbor, and neighboring Imaizaki Airfield had a 4,000-foot (1,200 m) and a 5,000-foot (1,500 m) runway. These facilities were subject to sporadic air raids by United States Army Air Forces and United States Navy forces based in the Aleutian Islands from 1943 until the Japanese Emperor Hirohito announced the surrender of Japan on 15 August 1945.

The Soviet Union continued combat operations against Japan until early September 1945. During the Invasion of the Kuril Islands, Soviet forces landed on Shumshu on 18 August 1945, beginning the Battle of Shumshu, one of the last battles of World War II. Combat operations continued through 23 August 1945, ending with the surrender of the surviving members of the Japanese garrison. The Soviets sent the Japanese prisoners of war, including most Japanese male civilians, to labor camps and forcibly deported the remaining Japanese civilian inhabitants. The Soviets renamed Kataoka Baikovo (Russian: Байково), and the Soviet Union annexed the island in 1946, including it in the Russian Soviet Federated Socialist Republic. Japan formally gave up sovereignty over the island under the terms of the San Francisco Peace Treaty of 1951.

The island remained a part of Russia after the 1991 dissolution of the Soviet Union and is now administered as part of the Sakhalin Oblast of the Russian Federation.

== See also ==
- List of islands of Russia
