= Kataoka =

Kataoka (written: 片岡) is a Japanese surname. Notable people with the surname include:

- Azusa Kataoka (born 1988), Japanese voice actress and singer
- Chiezō Kataoka (1903–1983), Japanese actor
- Daisuke Kataoka (片岡 大育, born 1988), Japanese golfer
- Drue Kataoka, Japanese American visual artist
- Hiroji Kataoka (born 1941), Japanese academic
- Kataoka Ainosuke VI (born 1972), Japanese actor and kabuki actor
- Kataoka Nizaemon XII (1882–1946), Japanese kabuki actor
- Kataoka Shichirō (1854–1920), Imperial Japanese Navy officer
- Koji Kataoka (born 1977), Japanese footballer
- Kataoka Naoharu (片岡 直温, 1859–1934), Japanese politician
- Reiko Kataoka (born 1971), Japanese actress
- Satoshi Kataoka (born 1958), Japanese Go player
- Shinwa Kataoka (born 1985), Japanese actor
- Shuji Kataoka (born 1950), Japanese film director and screenwriter
- Tadasu Kataoka (1915–1963), Imperial Japanese Army officer
- Kataoka Tamako, (1905–2008), Japanese Nihonga painter
- Tsurutarō Kataoka (born 1954), Japanese actor
- Yasushi Kataoka (1876–1946), Japanese architect
- Yasuyuki Kataoka (born 1983), Japanese baseball player
- Yoshirō Kataoka (born 1945), Japanese anime producer
- Yōsuke Kataoka (born 1982), Japanese footballer

== Fictional characters ==
- Meg Kataoka (片岡 メグ), a character in the Assassination Classroom anime and manga

== See also ==
- Kataoka Station, a railway station in Tochigi Prefecture, Japan
- 10301 Kataoka, a main-belt asteroid
