= Kiichiro Higuchi =

Japanese general (1888-1970)

Kiichirō Higuchi
- 樋口 季一郎
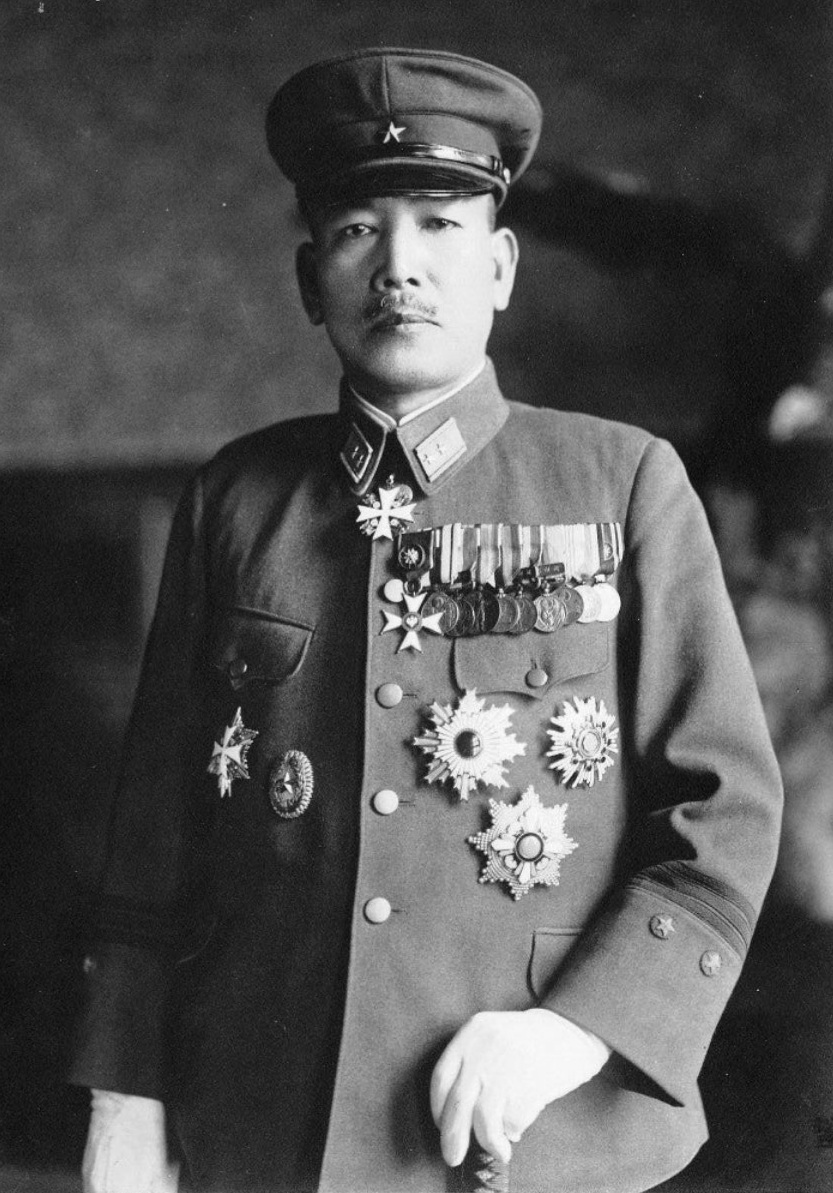
- Born: August 20, 1888; Minamiawaji, Hyōgo, Japan
- Died: October 11, 1970 (aged 82)
- Military career
- Allegiance: Empire of Japan
- Branch: Imperial Japanese Army
- Service years: 1910–1945
- Rank: Lieutenant General
- Commands: 9th Division; Fifth Area Army
- Conflicts: World War II; Soviet–Japanese War

Kiichirō Higuchi (樋口 季一郎, Higuchi Kiichirō; 20 August 1888 – 11 October 1970) was a lieutenant general in the Imperial Japanese Army in World War II.

== Biography ==
Higuchi was born in what is now part of Minamiawaji City on Awaji Island, Hyōgo Prefecture, as the eldest of nine siblings. When he was eleven years old, his parents divorced and he was raised by his mother's family. He was a graduate of the 21st class of the Imperial Japanese Army Academy and the 30th class of the Japanese Army Staff College. As a junior officer, he was sent as military attaché to Poland from 1925 to 1938. Due to his fluency in the Russian language, Higuchi was later posted to Manchuria with the Kwantung Army. Higuchi was a close confidant of General Kanji Ishiwara and of General Korechika Anami.

From 1933–1935, he was commander of the IJA 41st Infantry Regiment, and from 1935–1937 served as Chief of staff of the IJA 3rd Division. In 1937, he was sent to Germany as part of a military delegation.

As a major general and the commander of the Japanese-occupied Chinese Harbin Special Branch in 1937-1938, he, with the help of Yosuke Matsuoka, allowed 20,000 Jewish refugees who had fled Nazi Germany to cross the border from Otpor, USSR, to Manzhouli, Manchukuo (a Japanese puppet state), in an event which later became known as the Otpor Incident. Higuchi's subordinates were responsible for feeding the refugees, settling them in Harbin or Shanghai, and arranging for exit visas.

General Hideki Tojo, then Chief of staff of the Kwantung Army, assented to Higuchi's view that the German policy against the Jews was a serious humanitarian concern. Higuchi's lieutenant Norihiro Yasue advocated for the protection of Jewish refugees to General Seishiro Itagaki, which led to the establishment of the Japanese Jewish Policy Program in 1938.

Recalled to Japan in late 1938, Higuchi served briefly on the Imperial Japanese Army General Staff before being assigned as commanding officer of the IJA 9th Division in 1939. In 1942, he was promoted to lieutenant general and assigned to the Sapporo-based 5th Area Army. He participated in the invasion of the Aleutian islands, including the disastrous campaigns on Attu Island and Kiska Island. Afterwards, as commander of the Northern District Army he organized the defenses of northern Japan against invasion by Allied forces, fortifying Shumshu island in the northern Kurile Islands, and leading in the defense of South Sakhalin Island.

His name is listed in the Golden Book, which was used to record names of individuals who helped Jewish people. Higuchi was helped by Polish Jews when he faced discrimination during his travels to Poland.

== Bibliography ==
- Glantz, David (2003). The Soviet Strategic Offensive in Manchuria, 1945: 'August Storm'. Routledge. ISBN 0-7146-5279-2.
- Tokayer, Rabbi Marvin (2004). The Fugu Plan: The Untold Story Of The Japanese And The Jews During World War II. Gefen Publishing House. ISBN 965-229-329-6.
- Yamamuro, Shinichi (2005). Manchuria Under Japanese Domination. University of Pennsylvania Press. ISBN 0-8122-3912-1.

Military offices
Preceded by Yasuyo Yamasaki	Administrator of Occupied Aleutian Islands and Commander of North Sea Garrison; 1943—1943	Succeeded by Islands re-occupied by the United States
