= Fifth Area Army =

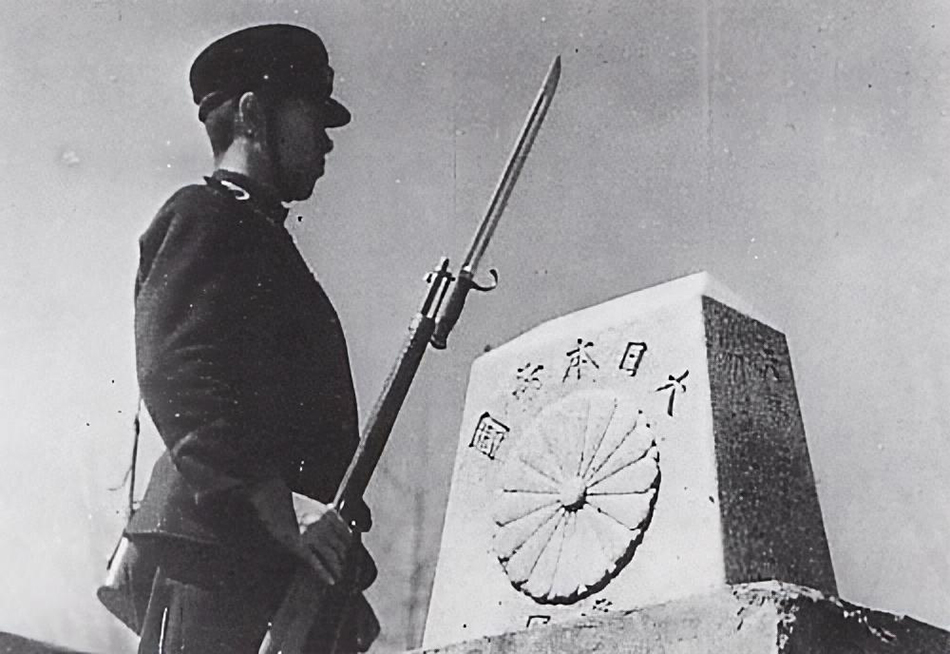
- Border between Japanese Karafuto and Soviet Sakhalin
- Active: March 16, 1944 - August 15, 1945
- Country: Empire of Japan
- Branch: Imperial Japanese Army
- Type: Infantry
- Role: Field Army
- Garrison/HQ: Sapporo
- Nickname(s): 達(Tatsu = “attain”)
- Engagements: Soviet–Japanese War: Invasion of South Sakhalin; Invasion of the Kuril Islands; Proposed Soviet invasion of Hokkaido

The Fifth Area Army (第5方面軍, Dai-go hōmen gun) was a field army of the Imperial Japanese Army during the closing stages of World War II. It saw combat against the Soviet Union in Japan’s northern territories.

== History ==
The Japanese 5th Area Army was formed on March 16, 1944 under the General Defense Command as part of the last desperate defense effort by the Empire of Japan to deter possible landings of Allied forces in Hokkaidō, Karafuto/South Sakhalin and the Chishima Islands/Kuriles during Operation Downfall (or Operation Ketsugō (決号作戦, Ketsugō sakusen) in Japanese terminology). It remained directly under the Imperial General Headquarters and was headquartered in Sapporo. The 5th Area Army leadership also held equivalent posts in the Northern District Army, and had the honor of receiving their appointments personally from Emperor Hirohito rather than the Imperial General Headquarters.

Although the Japanese were able to raise large numbers of new soldiers, training and equipping them was more difficult. By August, the Japanese Army had the equivalent of 65 divisions in the homeland but only enough equipment for 40 and only enough ammunition for 30. The 5th Area Army consisted mostly of poorly trained reservists, conscripted students and home guard militia. In addition, the Japanese had organized the Patriotic Citizens Fighting Corps — which included all healthy men aged 15–60 and women 17–40 — to perform combat support, and ultimately combat jobs. Weapons, training, and uniforms were generally lacking: some men were armed with nothing better than muzzle-loading muskets, longbows, or bamboo spears; nevertheless, they were expected to make do with what they had.

=== Soviet invasion of Manchuria ===
After breaking the Soviet–Japanese Neutrality Pact, the Soviet Union invaded Karafuto and the Kuril Islands on August 11, 1945, just four days before the surrender of Japan. Although the Red Army outnumbered the Japanese 88th Division by three to one, it was unable to advance until additional reinforcements arrived on 16 August due to strong Japanese resistance. Actual fighting continued until August 21, and the capital of Toyohara fell on August 25.

Many surviving soldiers of the 5th Area Army in Karafuto and Chishima became prisoners of war in Siberia and other parts of the Soviet Union until the mid-1950s. Units of the 5th Area Army based in Hokkaidō were demobilized after the surrender of Japan on August 15, 1945.

== List of Commanders ==
=== Commanding officer ===
| | Name | From | To |
|---|---|---|---|
| 1 | Lieutenant General Kiichiro Higuchi | 16 March 1944 | 21 August 1945 |

=== Chief of Staff ===
| | Name | From | To |
|---|---|---|---|
| 1 | Lieutenant General Matsujiro Kimura | 16 March 1944 | 26 December 1944 |
| 2 | Lieutenant General Saburo Hagi | 26 December 1944 | 21 August 1945 |
