= Kuril Strait =

Strait in Kuril Islands, Russia

Coordinates: 50.8355556°N 156.5847222°E

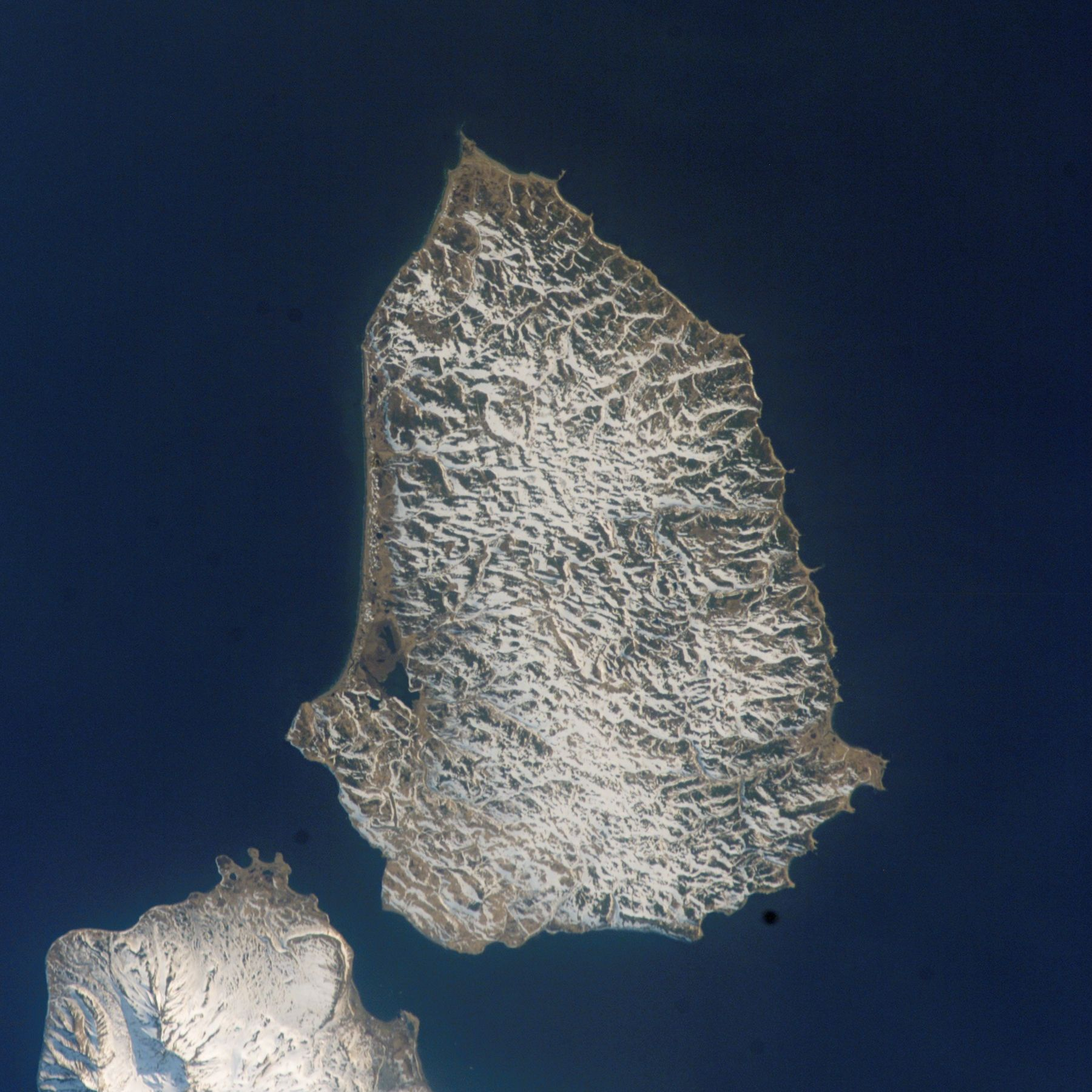
Shumshu Island is at center and Cape Lopatk at the bottom left. The Kuril Strait is at the Southwest point of the island between the two landforms.

First Kuril Strait (Russian: пролив Первый Курильский, Japanese: 占守海峡, Shumushu Strait) (also known as just Kuril Strait) is a strait separating the Shumshu Island of the Kuril Islands from the Cape Lopatka, Kamchatka Peninsula.

== See also ==
- Second Kuril Strait
- Fourth Kuril Strait
