= Twenty-Seventh Army (Japan) =

Japanese Twenty-Seventh Army
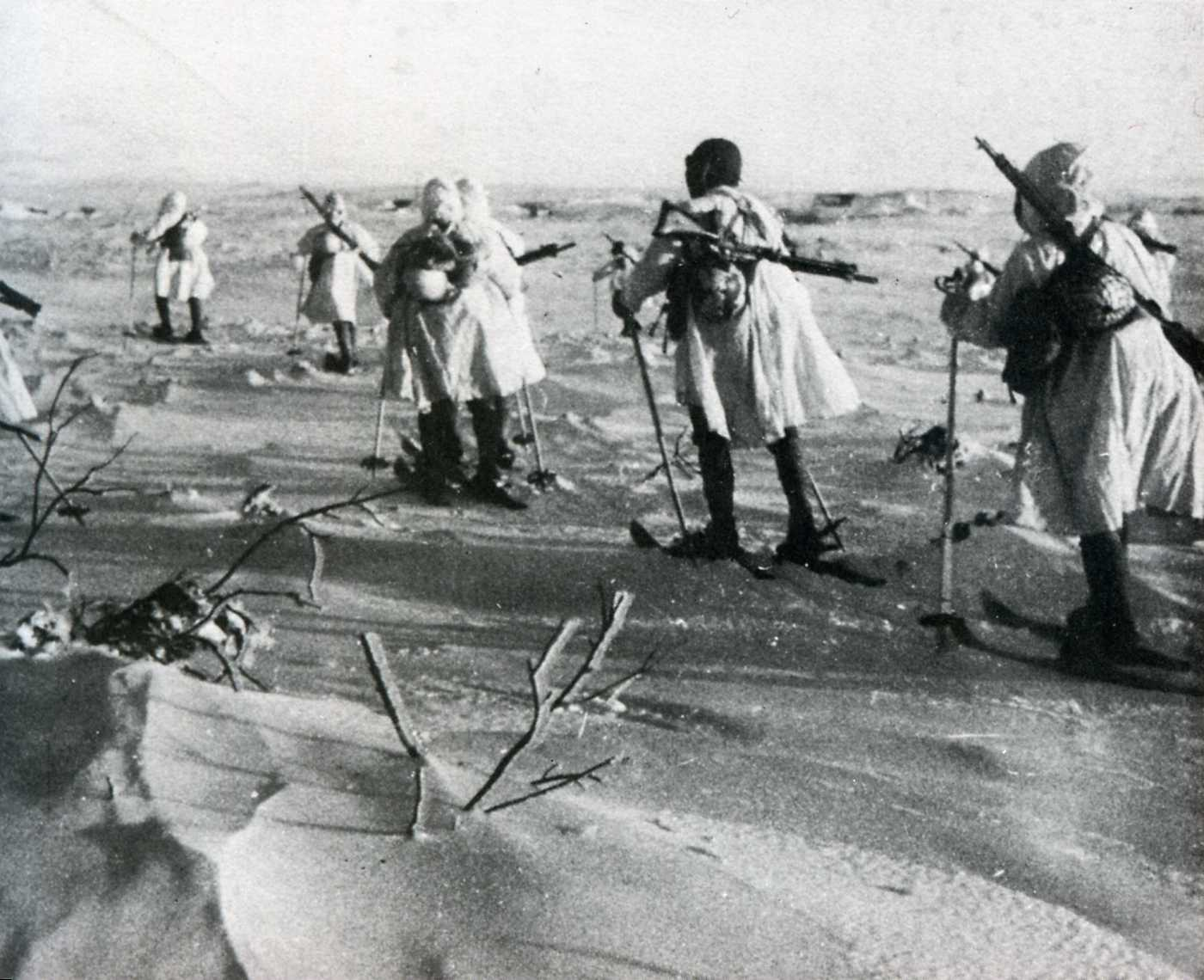
- Japanese ski troops in the Chishima Islands
- Active: March 16, 1944 – February 1, 1945
- Country: Empire of Japan
- Branch: Imperial Japanese Army
- Type: Infantry
- Role: Corps
- Garrison/HQ: Etorofu
- Nickname(s): Hokubu (北部, Northern)
- Engagements: Soviet invasion of Manchuria

The Japanese 27th Army (第27軍, Dai-nijyūnana gun) was an army of the Imperial Japanese Army during the final days of World War II.

== History ==
The Japanese 27th Army was formed on March 16, 1944, as part of the last desperate defense effort by the Empire of Japan to deter possible landings of Allied forces in the northern Chishima Islands territories from northeastern Hokkaidō to Kamchatka during Operation Downfall. It was headquartered on Etorofu.

The Japanese 27th Army consisted mostly of poorly trained reservists, conscripted students and home guard militia. It was disbanded on February 1, 1945, and its units were incorporated directly into the Japanese 5th Area Army

== List of Commanders ==
	Name	From	To
Commanding officer	Lieutenant General Shozo Terakura	10 March 1944	1 February 1945
Chief of Staff	Major General Keiji Suzuki	10 March 1944	1 February 1945

== See also ==
- Organization of Kita and Minami Fortresses
