= Severo =

Severo may refer to:

== People ==
Given name

- Severo Antonelli
- Severo Bonini
- Severo Calzetta da Ravenna
- Severo Colberg Ramírez
- Severo Eulálio
- Severo Fernández
- Severo Meza
- Severo Moto Nsá
- Severo Ochoa
- Severo Ornstein
- Severo Sarduy

Surname

- Alessandro Severo
- Marieta Severo
- Roberto Severo

In places:

- Severo-Baykalsky District
- Severo-Kurilsk
- Severo-Zapadny (disambiguation), several places

In other uses:

- Augusto Severo International Airport
- Severo-Evensk Airport
- Severo-Eniseysk Airport

== See also ==
- San Severo (disambiguation)
