= Severo-Kurilsky District =

Severo-Kurilsky District Северо-Курильский район (Russian)
- District
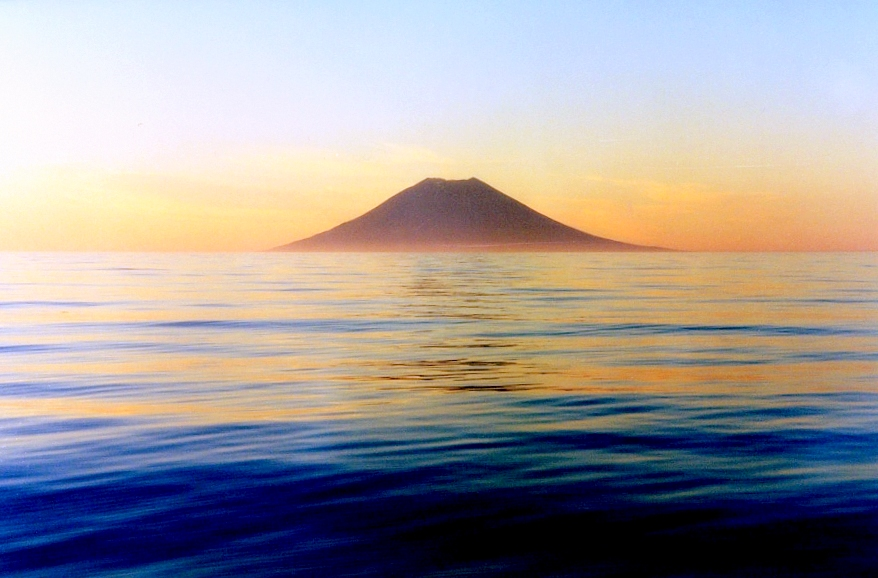
- Atlasov Island, the northernmost of the Kuril Islands

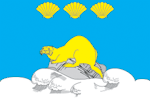
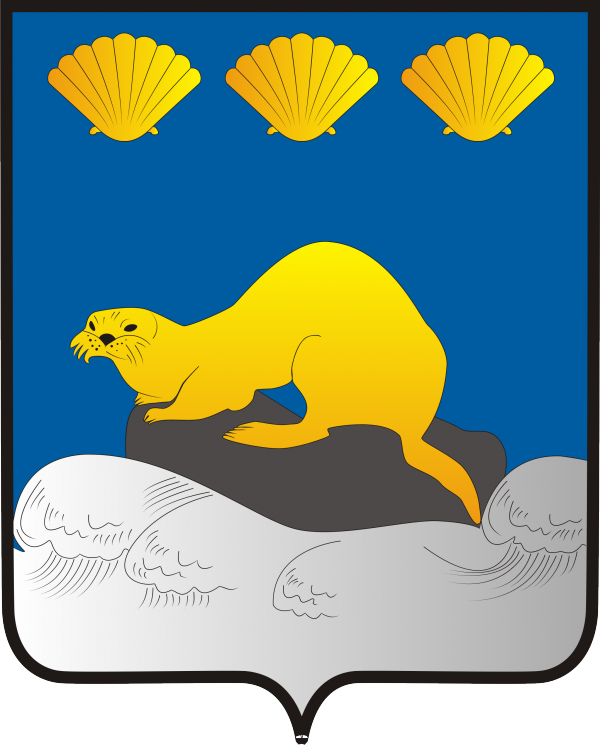
- Flag Coat of arms

- Location of Severo-Kurilsky District in Sakhalin Oblast
- Coordinates: 50°41′N 156°07′E
- Country: Russia
- Federal subject: Sakhalin Oblast
- Established: 5 June 1946
- Administrative center: Severo-Kurilsk

Area
  - Total: 3,501.2 km^{2} (1,351.8 sq mi)

Population (2010 Census)
  - Total: 2,536
  - Density: 0.7243/km^{2} (1.876/sq mi)
  - Urban: 100%
  - Rural: 0%

Administrative structure
  - Inhabited localities: 1 cities/towns, 1 rural localities

Municipal structure
  - Municipally incorporated as: Severo-Kurilsky Urban Okrug
- Time zone: UTC+11 (MSK+8)
- OKTMO ID: 64743000
- Website: http://sevkur.admsakhalin.ru/

Severo-Kurilsky District (Russian: Се́веро-Кури́льский райо́н) is one of the seventeen administrative districts (raion) of Sakhalin Oblast in Russia. It is a part of the northern Kuril Islands, located to the east of the Island of Sakhalin and southwest of the Kamchatka Peninsula in the Russian mainland. Covering an area of 3,501.2 km^{2} (1,351.8 sq mi), its seat and administrative center is the town of Severo-Kurilsk on Paramushir island. As per the 2010 census, it had a population of 2,536 inhabitants with the entire population residing in Severo-Kurilsk. The economy is largely based on fisheries and seafood processing.

== Geography ==
Severo-Kurilsky is one of the seventeen administrative districts (raion) of Sakhalin Oblast in Russia. Covering an area of 3,501.2 km^{2} (1,351.8 sq mi), it is a part of the northern Kuril Islands. It is located to the east of the Island of Sakhalin and southwest of the Kamchatka Peninsula in the Russian mainland. Its seat and administrative center is the town of Severo-Kurilsk on Paramushir island.

The climate varies from sub-Arctic to temperate climate along the islands. The vegetation varies and is mostly composed of larch and spruce trees. Summers are mild, with temperatures rising above 10 degrees Celsius only for two months. Short, foggy months are followed by a long, and cold winter. The average annual rainfall ranges from 102 to 127 cm (40 to 50 in). The district is prone to natural disasters such as earthquakes, volcanic eruptions, and tsunamis. The 1952 Severo-Kurilsk earthquake and the tsunami that followed resulted in large-scale destruction of the entire town. The district was struck by another major earthquake and tsunami in 2025.

== Demographics and economy ==
As of 2010, the region had a population of 2,536 individuals, down from 5,420 recorded in 1989. The town of Severo-Kurilsk accounts for the entire population of the district. The economy is predominantly based on fishing and seafood processing industries. There is a major seaport located in the town of Severo-Kurilsk, which handles shipping operations. It is part of a special economic zone aimed at encouraging the seafood industry.

== Islands ==
Island	Russian: Name	Japanese: Name	Alternative names	Capital / Landing point	Other Cities	Area (km^{2})	Population
Shumshu	Шумшу	占守島	Shumushu	Baikovo		388.0	20=
Atlasov	Атласова	Araido / 阿頼度島	Oyakoba	Alaidskaya Bay		150.0	0=
Awos			Avos			0.1	0=
Paramushir	Парамушир	幌筵島	Paramushiro	Severo-Kurilsk	Shelikovo, Podgorny	2,053.0	2,540
Antsiferov	Анциферова	志林規島	Shirinki	Antsiferov beach	Cape Terkut	7.0	0=
Makanrushi	Маканруши	磨勘留島	Makanru	Zakat		50.0	0=
Onekotan	Онекотан	温禰古丹島		Mussel	Kuroisi, Nemo, Shestakov	425.0	0=
Kharimkotan	Харимкотан	春牟古丹島	Harimukotan, Harumukotan	Sunazhma	Severgin Bay	70.0	0=
Ekarma	Экарма	越渇磨島	Ekaruma	Kruglyy		30.0	0=
Chirinkotan	Чиринкотан	知林古丹島		Cape Ptichy		6.0	0=
Shiashkotan	Шиашкотан	捨子古丹島	Shasukotan	Makarovka		122.0	0=
Raikoke	Райкоке	雷公計島		Raikoke		4.6	0=
Matua	Матуа	松輪島	Matsuwa, Matsua	Sarychevo		52.0	0=
Rasshua	Расшуа	羅処和島	Rasutsuwa, Rashowa	Arches Point		67.0	0=
Ushishir	Ушишир	宇志知島	Ushishiru	Kraternya	Ryponkicha	5.0	0=
Ketoy	Кетой	計吐夷島	Ketoi	Storozheva		73.0	0=
