= USS S-34 =

Submarine of the United States

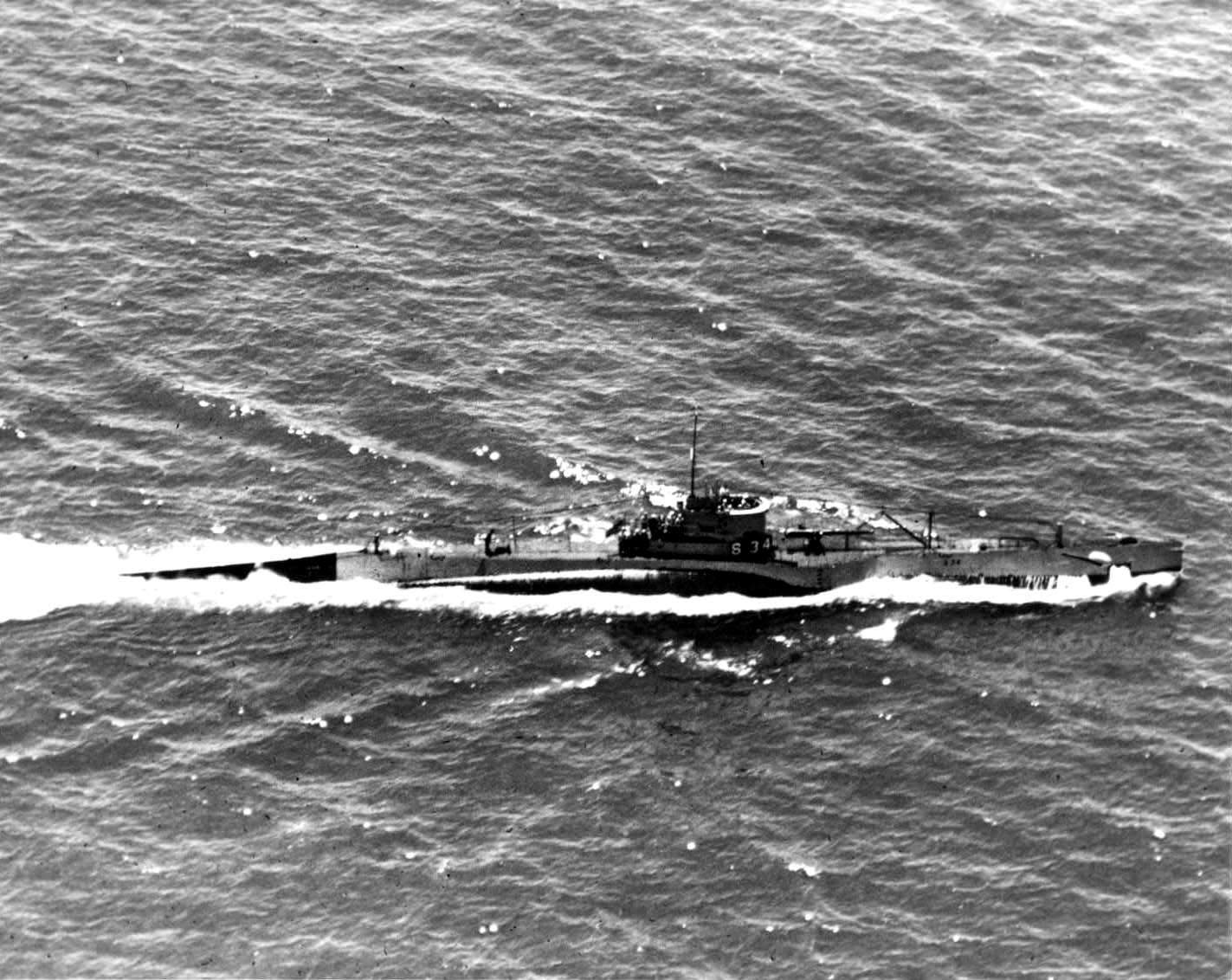
- USS S-34

History

United States
- Name: USS S-34
- Builder: Bethlehem Shipbuilding Corporation
- Laid down: 28 May 1918
- Launched: 13 February 1919
- Commissioned: 12 July 1922
- Decommissioned: 25 October 1922
- Recommissioned: 23 April 1923
- Decommissioned: 23 October 1945
- Stricken: 1 November 1945
- Fate: Sold for scrap, 1946

General characteristics
- Class & type: S-class submarine
- Displacement: 854 long tons (868 t) surfaced; 1,062 long tons (1,079 t) submerged
- Length: 219 ft 3 in (66.83 m)
- Beam: 20 ft 8 in (6.30 m)
- Draft: 15 ft 11 in (4.85 m)
- Speed: 14.5 knots (16.7 mph; 26.9 km/h) surfaced; 11 knots (13 mph; 20 km/h) submerged
- Complement: 42 officers and men
- Armament: 1 × 4 in (100 mm)/50 deck gun; 4 × 21 inch (533 mm) torpedo tubes

Service record
- Operations: World War II
- Awards: 1 battle star

USS S-34 (SS-139) was an S-class submarine of the United States Navy.

== Construction and commissioning ==
S-34 was laid down on 28 May 1918 by the Bethlehem Shipbuilding Corporation in San Francisco, California. She was launched on 13 February 1919 sponsored by Miss Florence Hellman, and commissioned on 12 July 1922.

== Service history ==
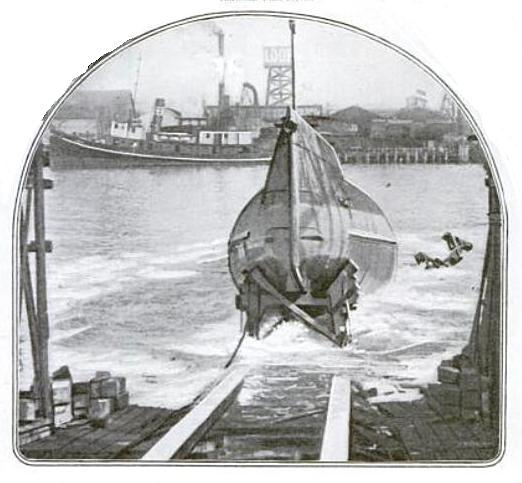
The launching of S-34 on 13 February 1919.

Following commissioning, S-34 was ordered to New London, Connecticut, for engineering alterations by the prime contractor, the Electric Boat Company. Decommissioned on 25 October 1922, she was delivered to the company which completed the work in the spring of 1923. The submarine was recommissioned on 23 April; and, after further trials and various exercises off the East Coast and in the Caribbean Sea, she returned to the West Coast, arriving at San Diego, California, her home port, on 6 August. For the next year and one-half, she remained based in southern California, then, in 1925, she was ordered to the Philippines. She departed from San Francisco, California, in mid-April, arrived at the Submarine Base, Cavite, P.I., on 12 July; and, after voyage repairs and an overhaul, commenced operations as a unit of the Asiatic Fleet. From then until 1932, she rotated between exercises, patrols, and overhauls in the Philippines during the winter and deployments to the China coast in the summer for operations out of Tsingtao. In 1932, she was ordered back to the eastern Pacific Ocean. She departed Manila on 2 May and headed for Pearl Harbor, whence she operated until April 1941. She then returned to San Diego.

During the remaining months of peace, S-34 provided services for the West Coast Sound School. With the attack on Pearl Harbor, defensive patrol work off the West Coast was added to her duties. However, with the new year, 1942, she and other World War I design submarines were ordered prepared for service in the northern Pacific in defense of the Aleutian Islands. She underwent overhaul at Mare Island, and, in March, she moved north to the newly established submarine base at Dutch Harbor, Unalaska. On 12 April, she headed west on her first war patrol.

=== First war patrol ===
One day out, a heavy wave threw the quartermaster of the watch against the side of the bridge, and S-34 was forced to return to base to put the badly injured man ashore. Arriving on 14 April, she cleared the harbor again the same day and resumed her westward passage. On 15 April, engineering casualties and poor weather slowed her progress. The next day, the weather moderated, but intensified again on 18 April. On 20 April, she left the Bering Sea and entered the less violent, but fog shrouded, waters of the Kuril Islands. Two days later, off the entrance to Onekotan Strait she attacked her first enemy target, but failed to score.

The next day, S-34 moved into the Sea of Okhotsk to take up her assigned station west of Paramushiro. Ice, two to five feet above the water, still covered the area and the boat retired through the strait to patrol on the Pacific side of the island.

24 April brought another unsuccessful attack on a merchantman and an attempt to close a warship. Two days later, the lookouts observed increased activity by enemy patrol planes. On 27 April, the S-boat again attempted to penetrate the ice, via Mushiru Strait. The same day, she returned to the Pacific; and, on 28 April she headed back to the Aleutians.

She encountered mountainous seas in the Bering Sea; but by 1 May, she was at Attu Island. Thence, she continued on to Kiska; remained offshore on 2 May as a storm battered the island; and, on 3 May, she replenished and moved north to intercept any enemy submarines which might be heading for the Gulf of Alaska. On 10 May, she returned to Dutch Harbor.

Refit as intelligence estimates predicting a Japanese thrust at Midway Island and the Aleutians were received, S-34 cleared Dutch Harbor on 28 May and stood west to patrol north of Attu. On 29 May, the Japanese Aleutian force sortied from Ominato and headed east, its approach to its target covered by fog and rain. On the morning of 3 June, Japanese planes bombed Dutch Harbor.

=== Second war patrol ===
From the start of her patrol until 11 June, S-34 remained in her assigned area, listening to reports, but sighting no enemy ships. On 11 June, she received news of the Japanese occupation of Kiska and orders to take "maximum offensive action." She headed for Kiska.

Diverted back to Dutch Harbor, she replenished on 12 June and got underway again the same day, but returned to Attu instead of going to Kiska. She reconnoitered Sarana Bay, Holtz Bay, and Chichagof Harbor; none showed any activity. On 17 June, she sighted a warship off the Semichi Islands, but could not close the range. She then returned to Attu and, on 20 June, sighted an enemy destroyer patrolling off Sarana Bay. Between 07:00 and 10:00, she sighted and lost the target twice as it moved in and out of the fog.

At 11:55, she sighted a large tanker inside the bay. Fifty minutes later, she slipped past a destroyer guarding the entrance and began maneuvering into the bay. Her target was engaged in refueling another destroyer. At 13:50, S-34 grounded at a depth of 48 feet. Run up to 25 feet, she came out of the water to the waterline; then backed off into deep water. Within five minutes, she was operating at periscope depth. The fueling destroyer had gotten underway from alongside the tanker and was racing across the intervening waters. S-34 fired two torpedoes at the destroyer, forcing the enemy to swerve and pass down the submarine's port side. Unable then to bring her tubes to bear on the tanker, the S-boat swung right to avoid depth charges. At 14:03, she bottomed in 164 feet, just inside the entrance to the bay, where she remained until 23:30.

During that time, only one destroyer was heard searching for her, the other, which had conducted the high speed attack, was heard pinging from the same spot for nine hours. She had presumably grounded after the attack, but, by 23:00, the tide had risen and she had moved to join in the search for the submarine.

At 23:30, S-34 began to make her way out of the bay. Twenty minutes later, one of the destroyers located her. The pace of the hunt was stepped up, but the quarry evaded attempts to destroy her. By 02:30 on 21 June, she had maneuvered out of the bay, lost her pursuer; and set a course for Dutch Harbor. On 26 June, S-34 moored in Dutch Harbor, whence she proceeded to Bremerton, Washington, for overhaul and training duty.

=== Third war patrol ===
On 13 September, she returned to Unalaska, and, on 14 September, she departed from Dutch Harbor on her third war patrol. Two days later, she crossed the 180th meridian; and, on 17 September, she arrived in the Semichi area and commenced crossing the Japanese supply lanes to the western Aleutians in search of targets. On 20 September, while off Buldir, her after radio mast was partially carried away by heavy seas and threatened to foul the propellers and stern planes. Despite the heavy seas, Chief Machinist's Mate B.F. Allen went over the side; cut the wreckage adrift and rigged two forward wing antennas.

On 21 September, the submarine resumed her patrol off Attu, reconnoitering the approaches to its harbors. On 26 September, she was ordered to Kiska, and, on the afternoon of 28 September, she sighted a minelayer off Kiska Harbor. The enemy, however, detected her presence before she could close the target. Destroyers joined the minelayer, and S-34 once again became the hunted. Forty minutes and 47 depth charges later, she cleared the immediate area. A week later, she sighted and closed a Kiska-bound enemy submarine; but, as the torpedoes were readied, depth control was lost; and she failed to score. On 8 October, she headed home, arriving at Dutch Harbor on 11 October.

=== Fourth war patrol ===
Storms and heavy seas abounded in the western Aleutians during S-34’s fourth war patrol, 23 October to 21 November. Operating in and across the Japanese traffic routes from Kiska to Agattu and Attu and between Paramushiro and Attu, she sighted only one possible target, a submarine which disappeared before identification could be made.

=== Fifth war patrol ===
She got underway for her fifth war patrol on 5 December. On 9 December, she resumed operations to intercept Japanese shipping between the Kurils and the Aleutians. Twenty days later, she returned to Dutch Harbor.

=== Overhaul ===
In early January 1943, the S-boat sailed south. On 18 January, she arrived at San Diego where she remained until late April, undergoing overhaul; receiving radar, air conditioning, and improved communication and navigation equipment, and providing services to the West Coast Sound School. On 10 May, she returned to Dutch Harbor; and, on 13 May, she departed from that base to patrol again in the Kurils.

=== Sixth war patrol ===
By 22 May, S-34 was off Paramushiro and, for the next 12 days, she patrolled in the southern approaches to the island, and in Shumushu and Paramushiro strait. On the evening of 31 May 1943, she mistakenly torpedoed and sank the Soviet 2,600-gross register ton survey ship Chukcha off Torishimo Retto. On the evening of 3 June, she cleared the area.

=== Seventh war patrol ===
Arriving back at Dutch Harbor on 10 June, she departed again 11 days later. On 28 June, she approached the fog-bound Kurils; and, on 1 July, she moved toward the Kamchatka Peninsula to locate and destroy enemy fishing vessels operating near and north of Cape Lopatka. On 3 July, while she was charging, fire broke out in the port motor, but was quickly extinguished. Repairs were completed on 5 July; and, on 7 July, she moved into a new area, Onekotan Island. The next day, she returned to Paramushiro. On 13 July, she sighted two ships and commenced closing the targets despite poor visibility. Shortly after noon, she launched three torpedoes, but her crew heard only thuds as they struck the target. On 15 July, she moved back into Paramushiro Strait and, on 22 July set a course for Unalaska.

== Retirement ==
Arriving on 30 July, she moved south in early August and, at mid-month, arrived at San Diego where she provided training services through the end of World War II. Then ordered inactivated, she proceeded to San Francisco where she was decommissioned on 23 October 1945. Her name was struck from the Naval Vessel Register the following month, and her hulk was sold for scrapping in 1946.

== Honors and awards ==
- Yangtze Service Medal
- American Defense Service Medal
- American Campaign Medal
- Asiatic-Pacific Campaign Medal with one battle star
- World War II Victory Medal
