= Saint Severus =

Saint Severus may refer to:

People

- Severus of Antioch or Saint Severus the Great (465–518), a Greek monk and theologian
- Severus of Avranches (died c. 690), a French peasant who became Bishop of Avranches
- Severus of Barcelona (died c. 304), a legendary Bishop of Barcelona
- Severus of Naples (died 409), a bishop of Naples during the 4th and 5th centuries
- Severus of Ravenna, 4th-century bishop
- Severus of Reims, bishop of Reims from 394 to 400
- Saint Severus of Novempopulania (died 407), beheaded by Visigoths
- Severus of Vienne (died c. 455), a missionary in France

Places

- St. Severus (Gemünden), a collegiate foundation in Gemünden, Germany

== See also ==
- Severus (disambiguation)
- San Severo (disambiguation)
