= Krenitsyn Strait =

Strait in the Kuril Islands, Russia

Coordinates: 49°12′N 154°33′E

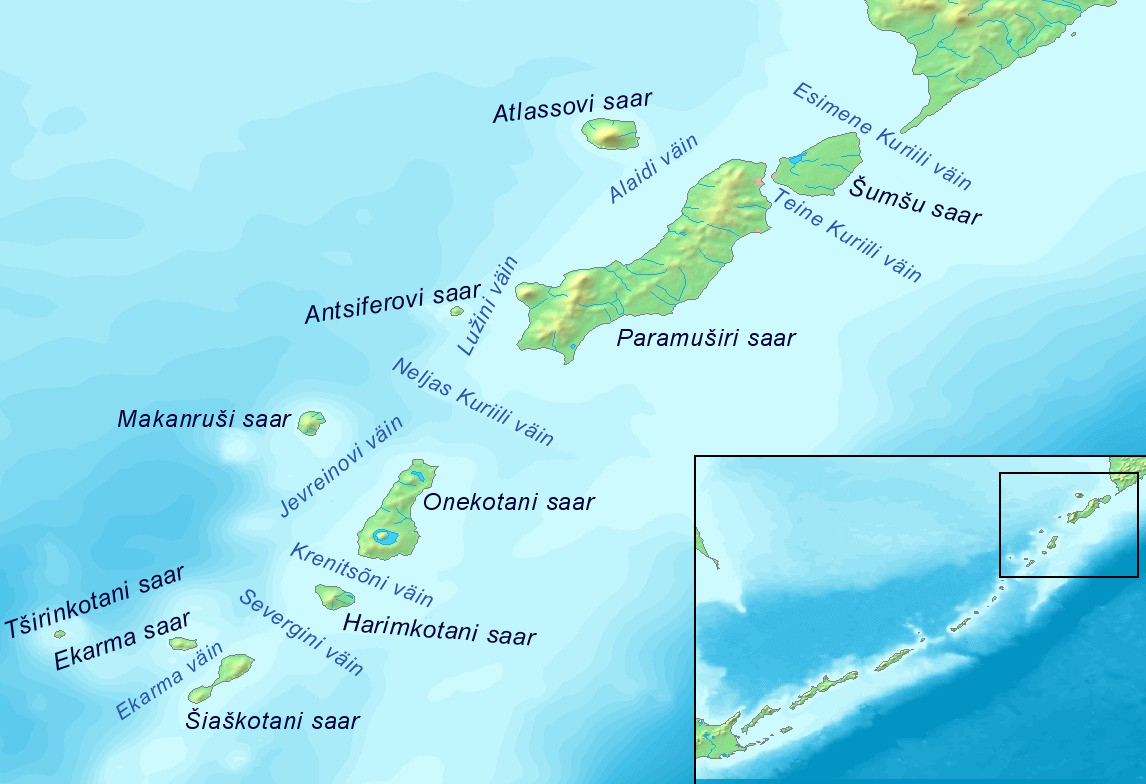
Kuriilide kirdeosa kaart

Krenitsyn Strait (Russian: Proliv Krenitsyna; Japanese: Harumukotan Kaikyo) is a strait that separates the islands of Onekotan to the north from Kharimkotan to the south. It is 12 km (7.5 mi) wide. The flood tidal current in the strait sets northwest, while the ebb flows to the southeast. The former creates tide rips and eddies. These currents may reach up to four knots.
