= Sawiris =

Sawiris is the Arabic/Coptic equivalent for the Latin/Roman name Severus.

Sawiris may refer to:

- Sawiris family
  - Onsi Sawiris, founder of Orascom Group
  - Naguib Sawiris, Egyptian businessman, CEO of Orascom Telecom
  - Nassef Sawiris, Egyptian businessman, CEO of Orascom Construction Industries
  - Samih Sawiris, Egyptian businessman, CEO of Orascom Development
- Sawiris Foundation for Social Development, a charity run by Sawiris Family
