= Severus =

Severus is the name of various historical and fictional figures, including:

Emperors of the Roman empire

- Septimius Severus (145–211), Roman emperor from 193 to 211 (rarely known as Severus I.)
- Severus Caracalla (188–217), Roman emperor from 198 to 217
- Severus Alexander (208–235), Roman emperor from 222 to 235
- Valerius Severus, Roman emperor in the tetrarchy from 306 to 307 (rarely known as Severus II.)
- Libius Severus, Roman emperor from 461 to 465 (rarely known as Severus III.)

Other individuals

- Quintus Varius Severus, Roman politician from the late Republic
- Aulus Caecina Severus, Roman general and politician
- Claudius Severus, leader of the Helvetii in 69
- Cornelius Severus, Roman epic poet in Augustan age
- Sextus Julius Severus, 2nd-century Roman general
- Severus (Encratite), founder of the gnostic sect Severian Encratites
- Gaius Claudius Severus, Roman senator and consul in 112
  - Gnaeus Claudius Severus Arabianus, Roman philosopher, senator and consul in 146, son of Gaius Claudius Severus
  - Gnaeus Claudius Severus, Roman philosopher, senator and consul in 167 and 173, son of Arabianus
- Gaius Septimius Severus Aper, Roman Aristocrat
- Tiberius Claudius Severus Proculus, Roman senator and consul in 200
- Marcus Julius Philippus Severus Augustus (238–249), Roman co-emperor (247–249) with his father Philip the Arab
- Severus of Barcelona (died c. 304), a legendary Bishop of Barcelona
- Severus of Ravenna (c. 308–c. 348), bishop of Ravenna
- Sulpicius Severus (c. 363–c. 425), a Christian writer and native of Aquitania in modern-day France
- Severus of Reims, bishop of Reims from 394 to 400
- Severus of Naples (died 409), a bishop of Naples during the 4th and 5th centuries
- Severus, the first known Bishop of Vence in 439 and perhaps as early as 419
- Severus of Vienne (died c. 455), a missionary in France
- Severus of Antioch or Saint Severus the Great (465–538), a Greek monk and theologian, and Patriarch of Antioch
- Severus of Menorca, 5th-century AD Christian bishop of Menorca
- Severus II bar Masqeh (died 681), Patriarch of Antioch
- Severus of Avranches (died c. 690), a French peasant who became Bishop of Avranches
- Severus Ibn al-Muqaffaʿ (died 987), Coptic bishop and historian

Fictional characters

- Severus Snape, character in the Harry Potter series of novels by J. K. Rowling
- Captain Severus, character in Ultramarines: A Warhammer 40,000 Movie

== See also ==
- Severo (disambiguation), Italian and Spanish derivative
- Sawiris (disambiguation), Egyptian/Arabic derivative
