= Chikurachki =

Volcano in the northern Kuril Islands

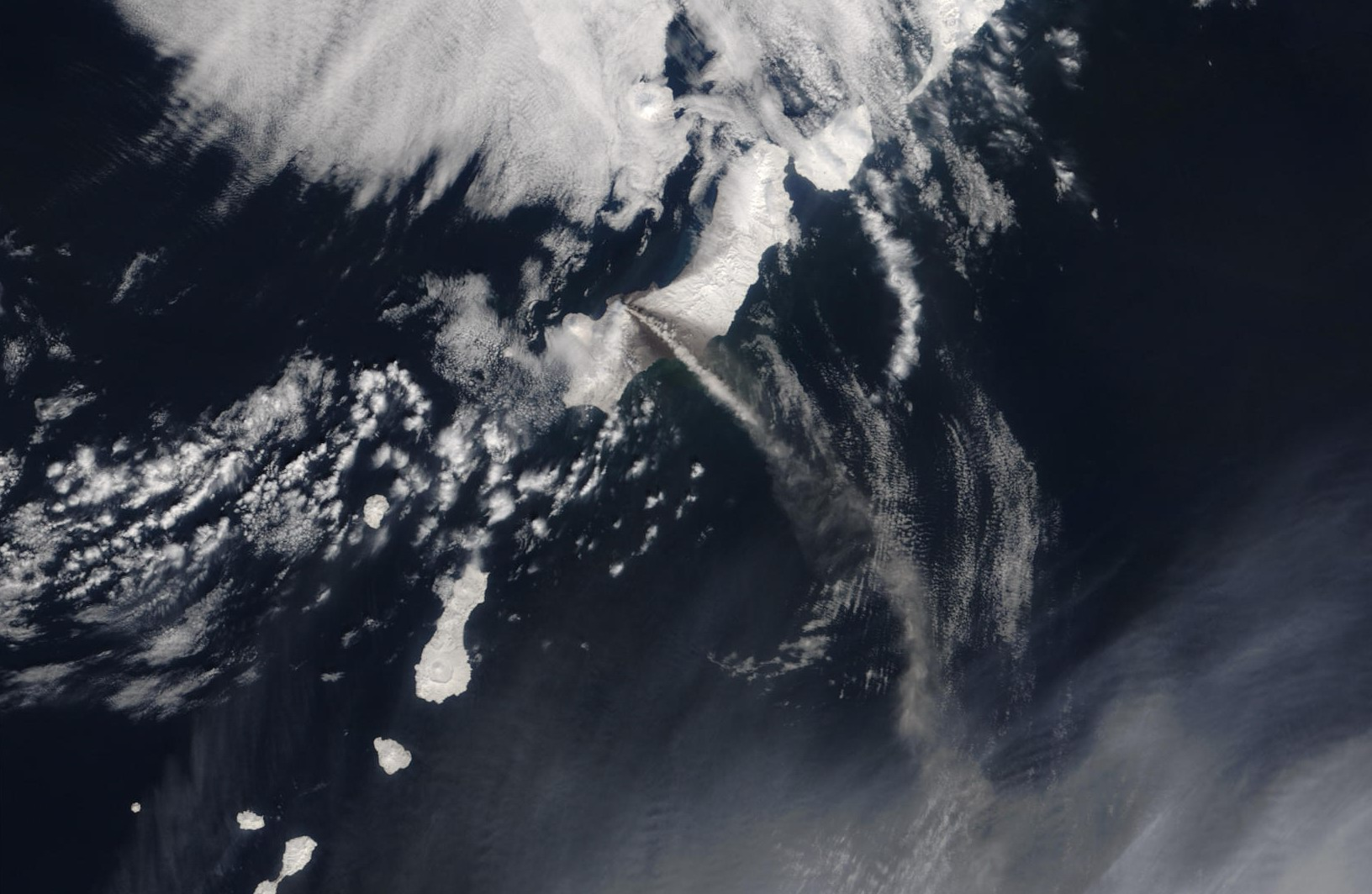
- Eruption of Chikurachki, 22 April 2003

Highest point
- Elevation: 1,816 m (5,958 ft)
- Prominence: 1,816 m (5,958 ft)
- Listing: Ultra, Ribu
- Coordinates: 50°19′24″N 155°27′39″E

Geography
- Location within Sakhalin Oblast
- Location: Paramushir, Kuril Islands, Russia

Geology
- Mountain type: Stratovolcano
- Last eruption: September 21–22, 2026

Chikurachki (Russian: Чикурачки; Japanese: 千倉岳, Chikura-dake) is the highest volcano on Paramushir Island in the northern Kuril Islands. It is actually a relatively small volcanic cone constructed on a high Pleistocene volcanic edifice. Oxidized andesitic scoria deposits covering the upper part of the young cone give it a distinctive red color. Lava flows from the 1,816-metre (5,958 ft) high Chikurachki reached the sea and formed capes on the northwest coast; several young lava flows also emerge from beneath the scoria blanket on the eastern flank.

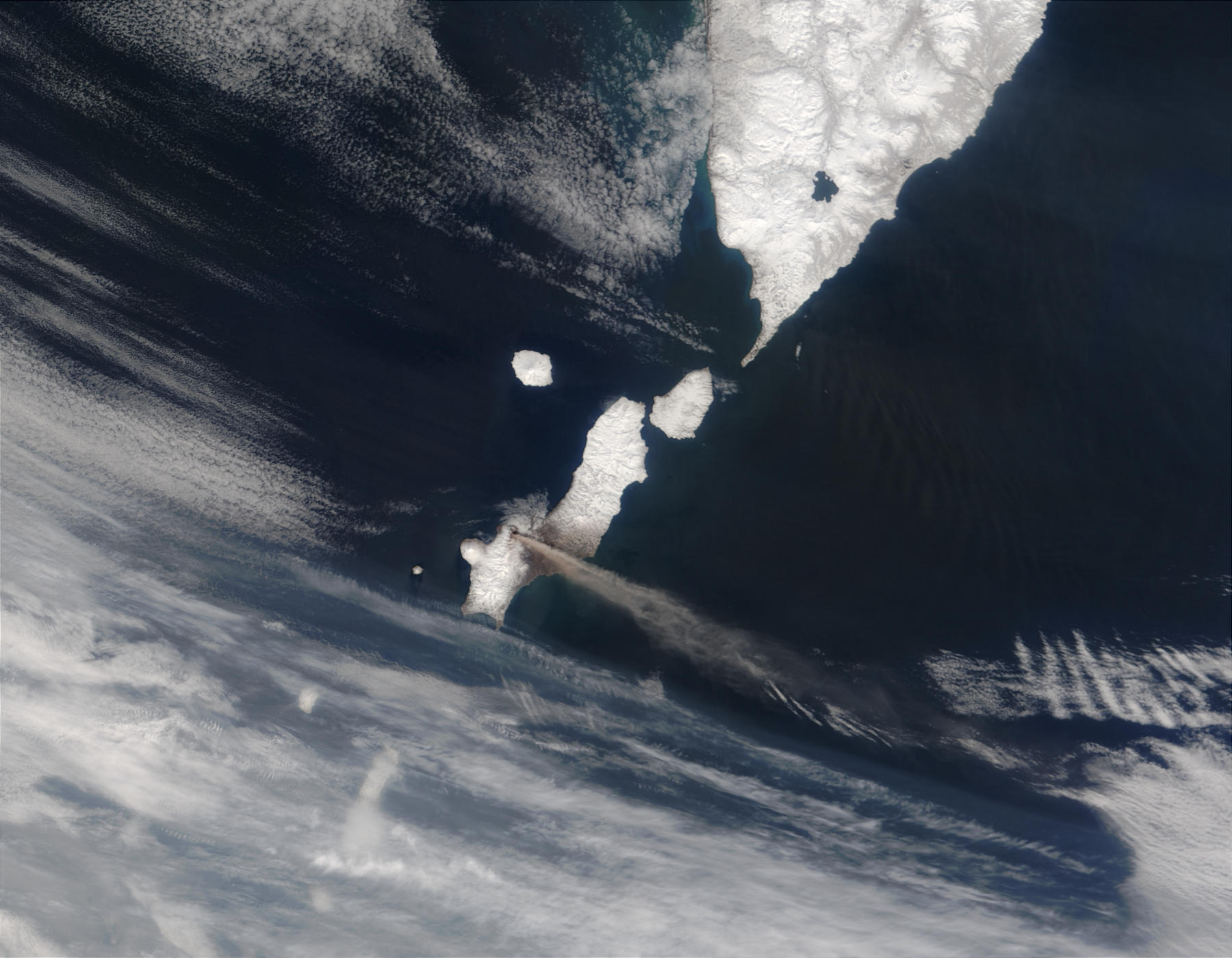
Eruption of Chikurachki, 13 May 2003

== See also ==
- List of volcanoes in Russia
- List of ultras of Northeast Asia
