= Onekotan =

Uninhabited island in the Kuril Island chain

Native name: Онекотан (Russian); 温禰古丹島 (Japanese); シオネコタン (Ainu)
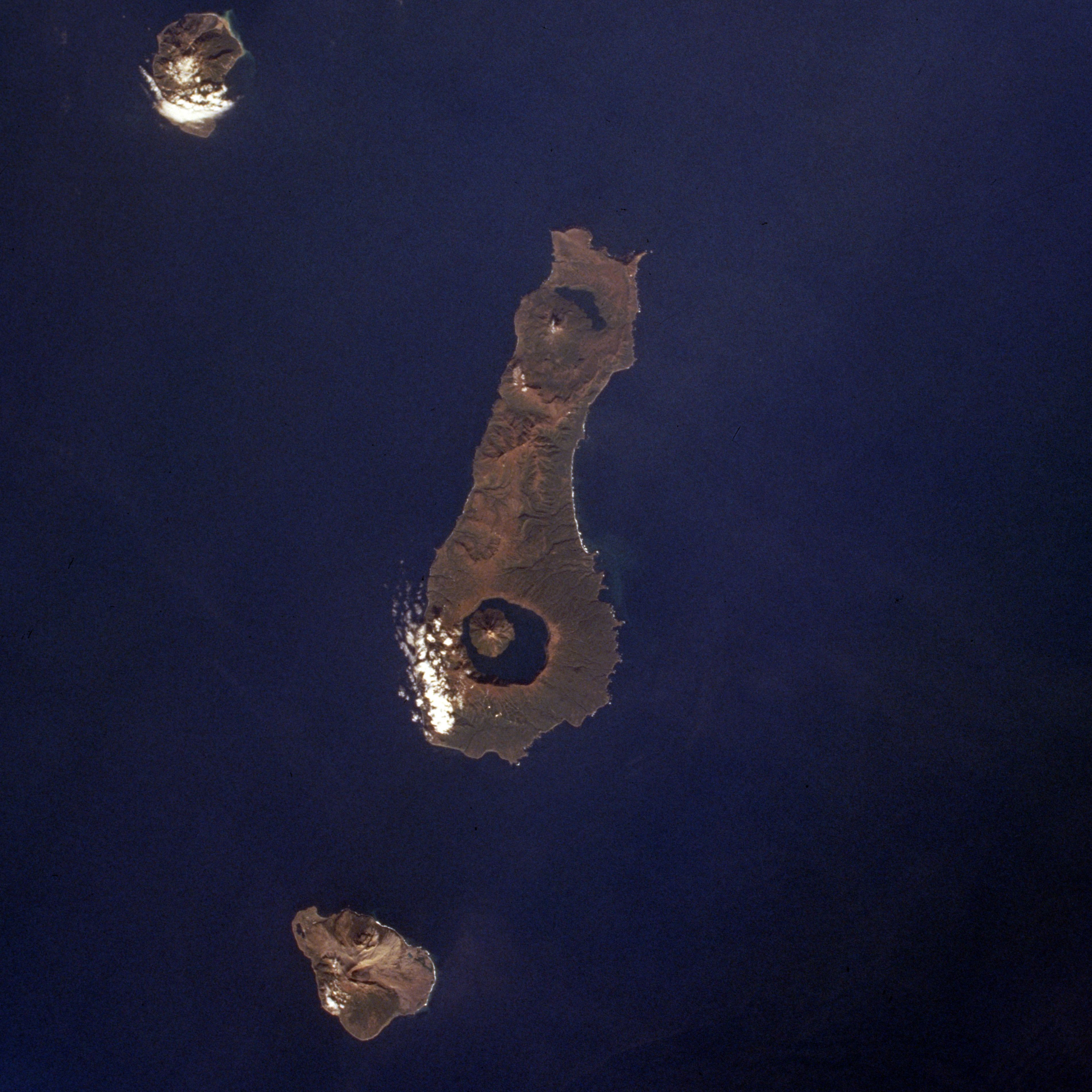
- Onekotan Island (centre) from space, October 1994. North at top

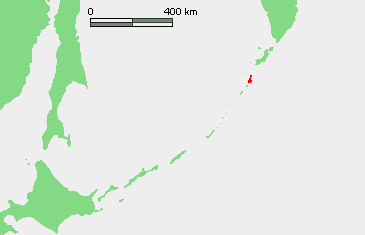

- Location within Sakhalin Oblast
- Interactive map of Onekotan

Geography
- Location: Sea of Okhotsk
- Coordinates: 49°27′N 154°46′E
- Archipelago: Kuril Islands
- Area: 425 km^{2} (164 sq mi)
- Highest elevation: 1,324 m (4344 ft)
- Highest point: Krenitsyn

Administration
- Russia

Demographics
- Population: 0
- Ethnic groups: Ainu (formerly)

Onekotan (Russian: Онекотан; Japanese: 温禰古丹島, romanized: Onekotan-tō, occasionally Onnekotan-tō; Ainu: オネコタン / オネコタㇴ) is an uninhabited volcanic island located near the northern end of the Kuril Islands chain in the Sea of Okhotsk in the northwest Pacific Ocean. Its name is derived from the Ainu language for "large village”. It is the second largest island, after Paramushir, in the northern subgroup of the Kurils. It is administratively included in the Severo-Kurilsky District of Sakhalin oblast, Russia.

== Geography and geology ==
Onekotan is roughly rectangular, with a length of 42.5 kilometers (26.4 mi), and a width ranging from 11 to 17 kilometers (6.8 to 10.6 mi). It has an area of 425 square kilometers (164 sq mi)

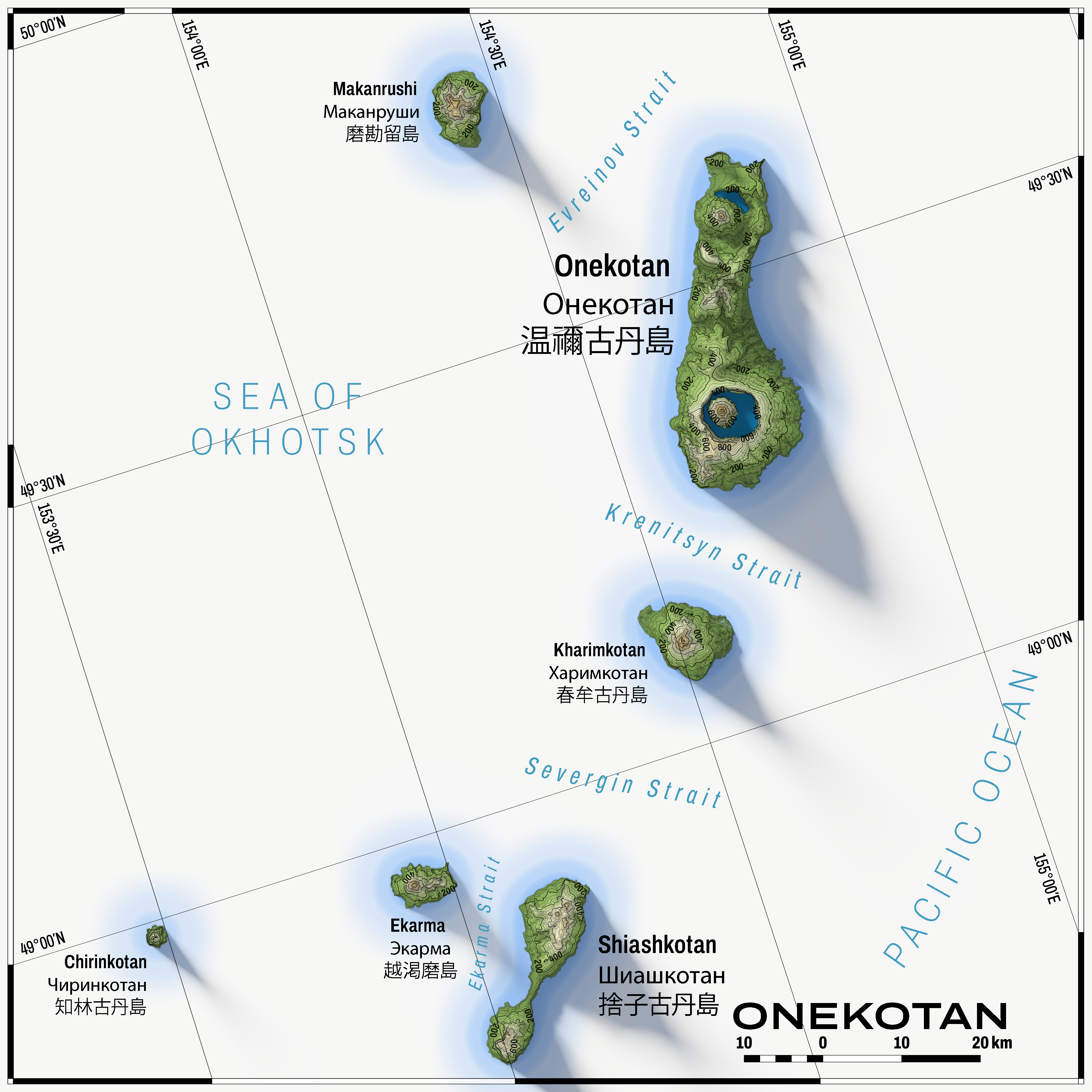
Topographic map of the Onekotan group

The island consists of two stratovolcanos connected by a relatively flat isthmus.

- Krenitsyn -(Russian: Креницын; Japanese 黒石山; Kuroishiyama) with a height of 1,324 meters (4,344 ft) is the prominent caldera at the southern end of the island. This volcano was named after Captain Pyotr Krenitsyn of the Imperial Russian Navy. The mountain rises from a depth of from 600 to 900 meters (2,000 to 3,000 ft), and contains a deep (369 m, 1,211 ft) central caldera lake (Koltsevoe Lake) with a diameter of 7 kilometers (4.3 mi), called Tao-Rusyr Caldera. The central peak of this "island within the island" is actually the highest point on Onekotan Island.
- Nemo -(Russian: влк Немо; Japanese 根茂山; Nemoyama) with a height of 1,019 meters (3,343 ft) is the peak to the north. It has two nested subsidiary calderas, with the cone of Nemo Peak rising in the southwest end of the youngest caldera and a crescent-shaped crater lake, named Lake Chernoye, partially filling the northeast part.

The contemporary structure of the caldera basin of Koltsevoe Lake was examined by Kozlov et al. through sonar survey utilizing a digital sonar and satellite positioning. The survey yielded 27 sonar profiles and a compiled bathymetric map. Presently, the lake holds the fourth position among Russia's deepest lakes, standing as the deepest in the Russian Far East and the largest in the Sakhalin region. Its significant water volume underscores its importance as a vital hydrological asset in the Far Eastern macro-region.

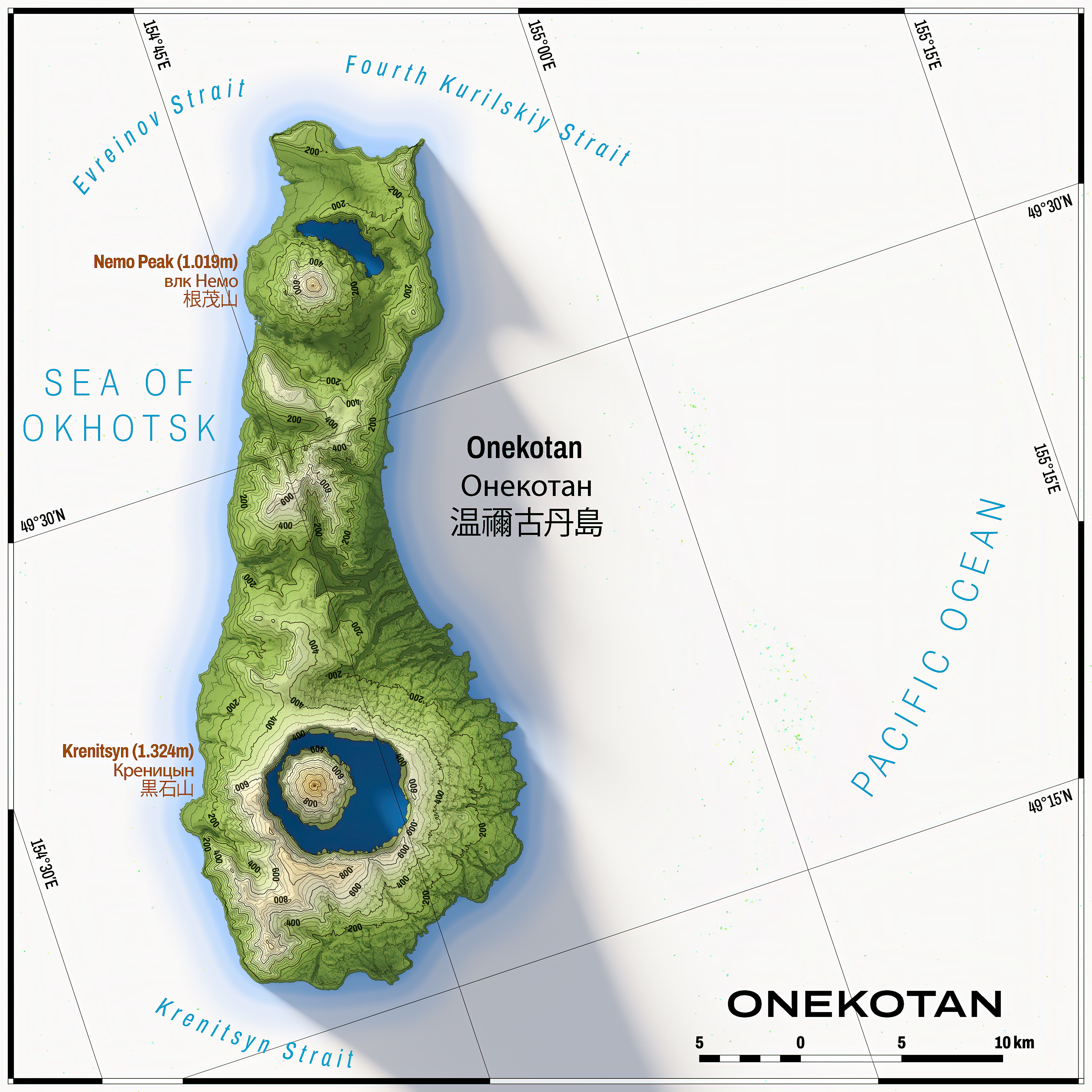
Topographic map of Onekotan Island

There are seven rivers on the island more than five kilometers long. The largest is Ozernaya River (8 kilometers (5.0 mi) long, which flows from the southern part of the caldera of the Nemo volcano to the Sea of Okhotsk. Almost the same length is the Kedrovka River, which flows from the central part of the island into the Pacific Ocean.

The climate of Onekotan is characterized by short, cool summers, high humidity, frequent fogs, and especially strong winds. However, the island's climate is generally considered to be mild oceanic with an average annual temperature of about 4.0 °C (39.2 °F). Even in record cold winters, temperatures below −15 °C (5 °F) were not observed.

Onekotan is separated from the neighboring islands by the Fourth Kuril Strait, Yevreinov Strait, and Krenitsyn Strait. The neighboring islands are Makanrushi, with a 1,170-meter (3,840 ft) volcanic peak, is 28 kilometers (17 mi) to the northwest of Onekotan; and Kharimkotan, with a 1,210-meter (3,970 ft) high volcano, is 15 kilometers (9.3 mi) to the southwest. Paramushir is located 53 kilometers (33 mi) to the northeast.

Onekotan still has an active volcano with the most recent eruption, in 1952, forming a small lava dome on the coast of Krenitsyn island within the lake of Tao-Rusyr Caldera. A bay on the eastern shore contains the remains of an abandoned settlement.

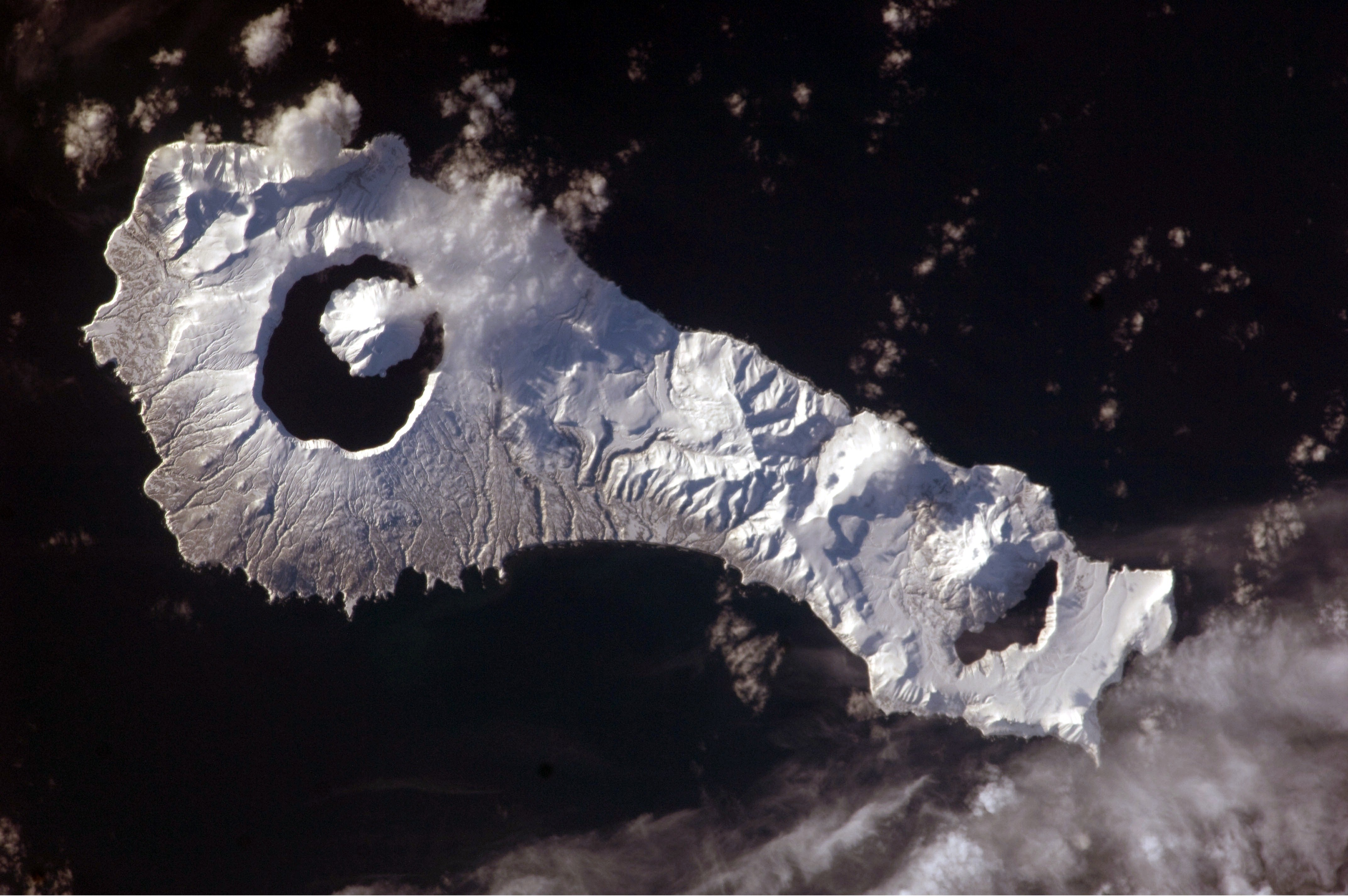
Snow cover highlights the calderas and volcanic cones that form the northern and southern ends of Onekotan.

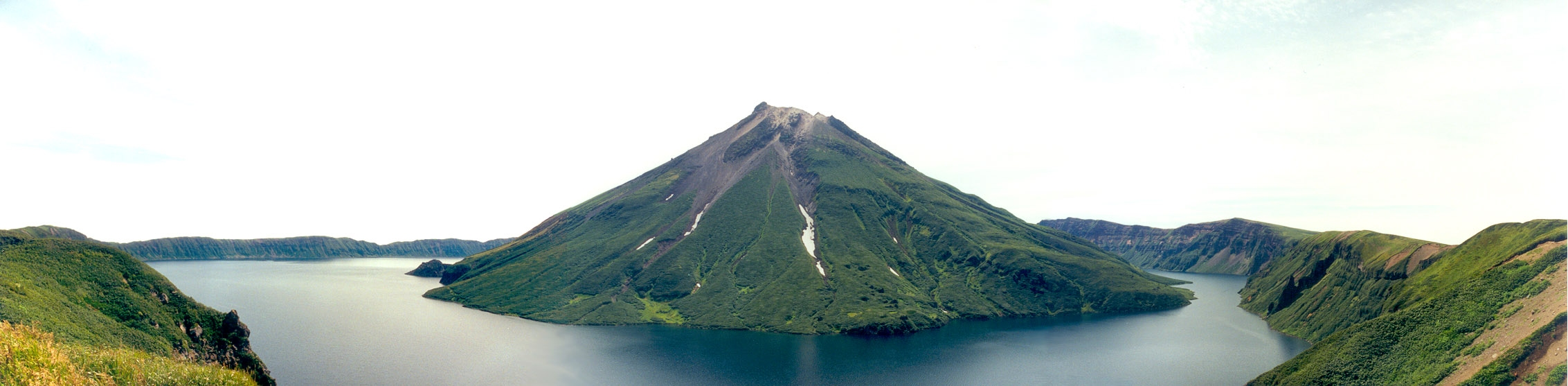
View of Krenitsyn Peak from the rim of Tao-Rusyr Caldera on Onekotan Island

== Climate ==
Climate data for Onekotan, Russia
Month	Jan	Feb	Mar	Apr	May	Jun	Jul	Aug	Sep	Oct	Nov	Dec	Year
Mean daily maximum °F (°C)	28 (−2)	27 (−3)	30 (−1)	33 (1)	37 (3)	43 (6)	50 (10)	53 (12)	52 (11)	45 (7)	37 (3)	31 (−1)	39 (4)
Mean daily minimum °F (°C)	24 (−4)	23 (−5)	26 (−3)	30 (−1)	34 (1)	40 (4)	47 (8)	51 (11)	49 (9)	42 (6)	33 (1)	27 (−3)	36 (2)
Average precipitation inches (mm)	3.2 (81)	2.9 (74)	3.7 (94)	3.0 (76)	2.0 (51)	2.0 (51)	2.3 (58)	2.8 (71)	4.0 (100)	4.9 (120)	5.2 (130)	4.0 (100)	40 (1,006)
Source: MSN.com "Records and Averages for Onekotan, Russia". Web: .

== History ==
Onekotan, with a number of shallow bays and sandy beaching providing landing points, was inhabited by the Ainu prior to European contact. It appears on an official map showing the territories of Matsumae Domain, a feudal domain of Edo period Japan dated 1644, and these holdings were officially confirmed by the Tokugawa shogunate in 1715.

The island was surveyed by Russian geodesists and explorers Ivan Yevreinov and Fyodor Luzhin in 1720, and was subsequently, claimed by the Empire of Russia in 1736 after the Ainu inhabitants were converted to the Russian Orthodox Church; however Russian tax collectors encountered Japanese officials on the islands in 1744–45.

Sovereignty initially passed to Russia under the terms of the 1855 Treaty of Shimoda, but was returned to the Empire of Japan per the Treaty of Saint Petersburg in 1875 along with the rest of the Kuril islands. The island was formerly administered as part of Shimushu District of Nemuro Subprefecture of Hokkaidō. In 1884, the Ainu inhabitants were relocated by Japanese authorities to Shikotan.

During World War II, the island had a small Japanese garrison, which surrendered on August 25, 1945, without a fight.

After 1945, the island came under the control of the Soviet Union, and is now administered as part of the Sakhalin Oblast of the Russian Federation. A small garrison on the island was withdrawn in 2005.

== Flora and fauna ==
There are chars in Lake Chyornoye, one of the two lakes on Onekotan, located at the northern end of the island.

In the spring and summer pigeon guillemot and Leach's storm petrel nest on the island.

Mammals found on the island include foxes and small rodents, with seals and sea lions on the coast.

The strong winds and harsh climate limit the growth of trees to small thickets of Krummholz formations of Siberian dwarf pine with a maximum height of 2–4 meters, mostly in gullies.

== See also ==
- List of volcanoes in Russia
- List of islands of Russia
- List of islands
- Desert island
