= Makanrushi =

Uninhabited island in the Kuril Island chain

Native name: Маканруши (Russian); 磨勘留島 (Japanese)
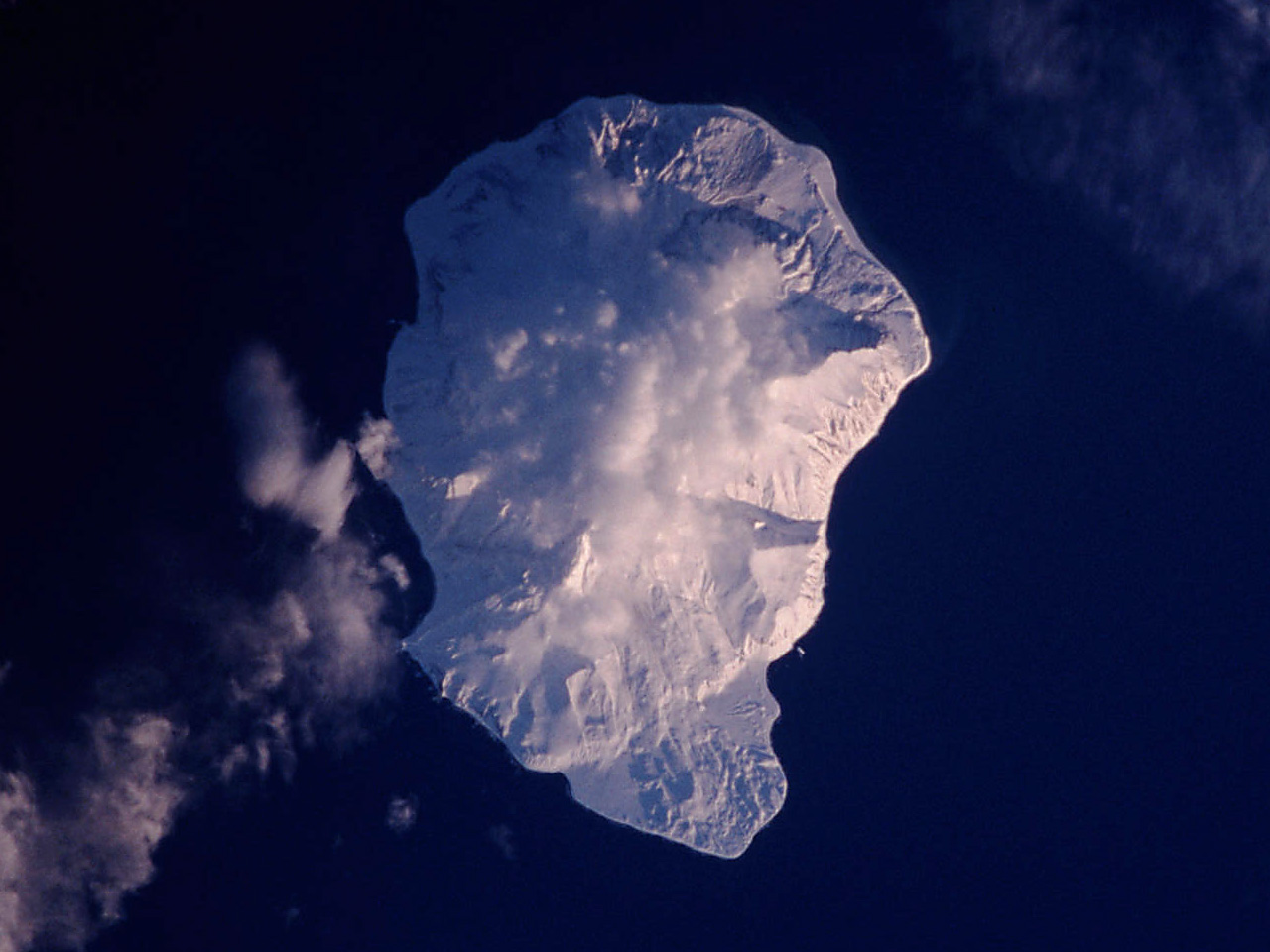
- Wintertime view of Makanrushi Island, January 2001. North at top.

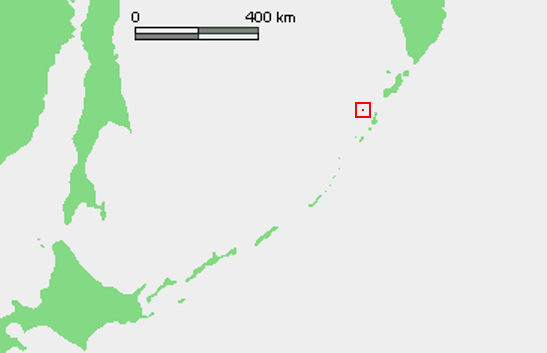

- Location within Sakhalin Oblast
- Interactive map of Makanrushi

Geography
- Location: Sea of Okhotsk
- Coordinates: 49.78°N 154.43°E
- Archipelago: Kuril Islands
- Area: 49 km^{2} (19 sq mi)
- Highest elevation: 1,169 m (3835 ft)
- Highest point: Pik Mitaka

Administration
- Russia

Demographics
- Population: 0

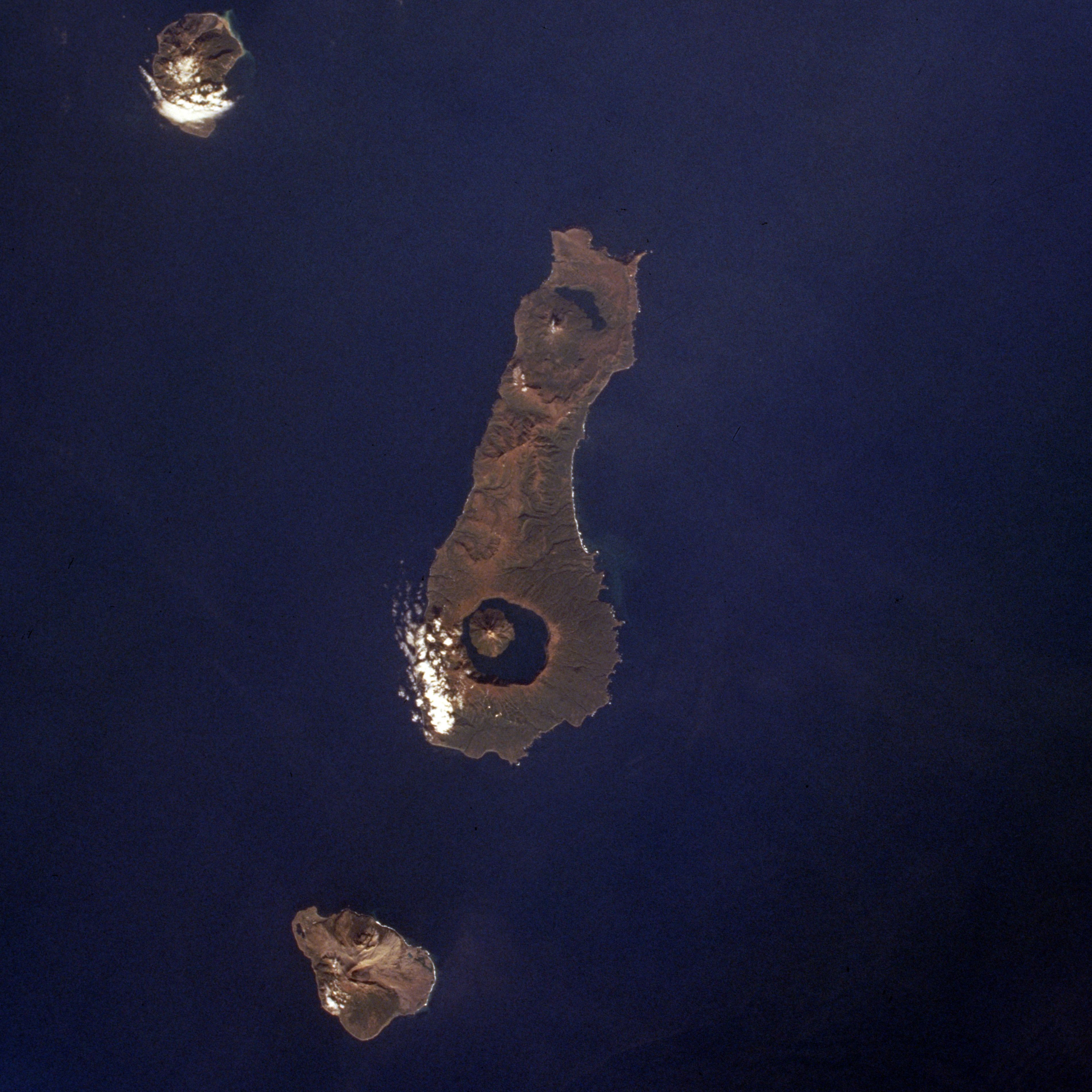
Onekotan Island (center), with Makanrushi at upper left and Kharimkotan at bottom. North at top.

Makanrushi (Russian: Маканруши; Japanese: 磨勘留島, romanized: Makanru-tō) is an uninhabited volcanic island located near the northern end of the Kuril Islands chain in the Sea of Okhotsk in the northwest Pacific Ocean. Its name is derived from the Ainu language.

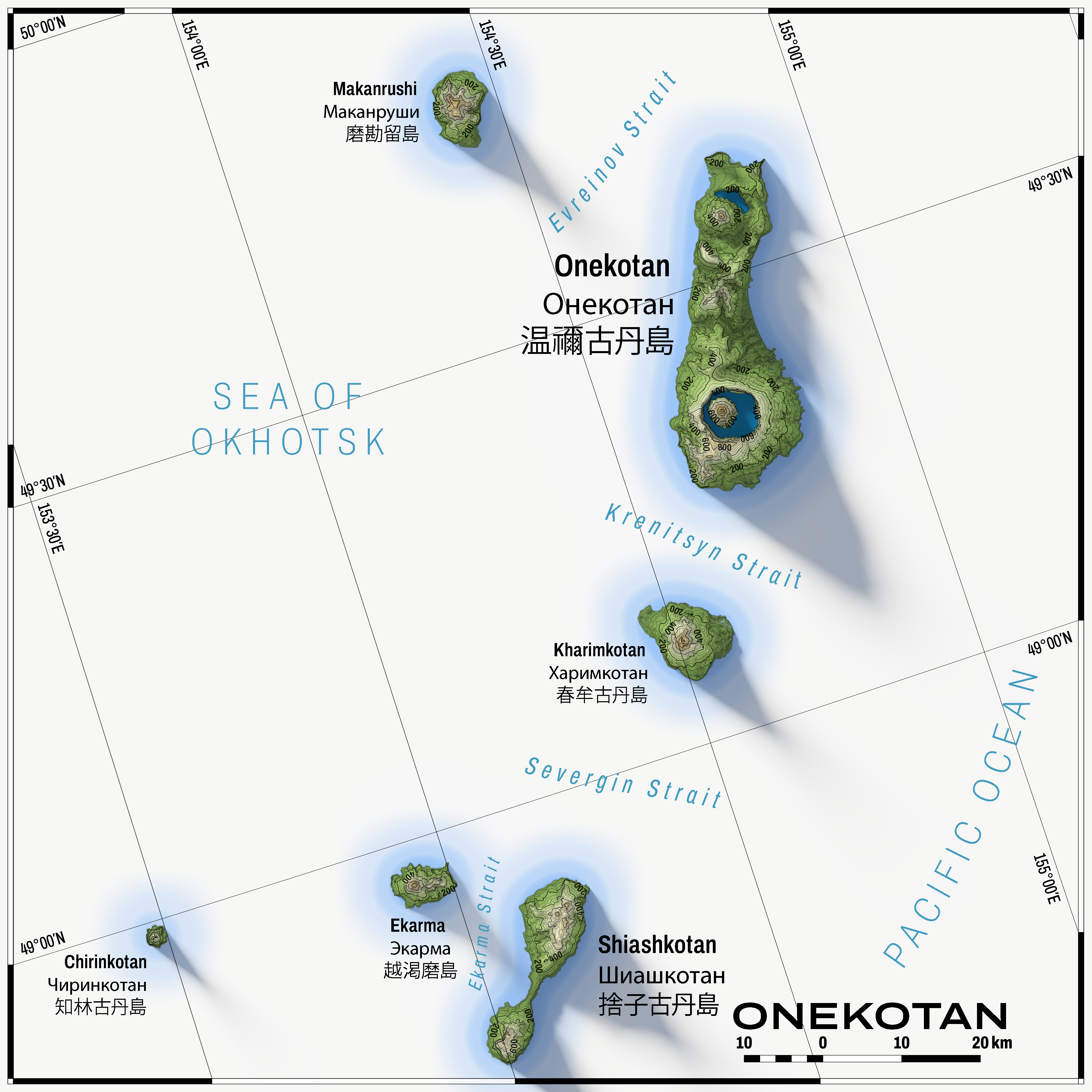
Topographic map of Onekotan, with Makanrushi

== Geology ==
Makanrushi is roughly rectangular, with an area of 49 square kilometres (19 sq mi)

The island consists of a dormant or extinct stratovolcano, Pik Mitaka (Russian: влк Митака; Japanese: 三高山, romanized: Mitakayama), which rises to 1,169 m (3,835 ft) above sea level. The island has steep cliff sides and no sandy beaches, making landing very difficult and dangerous even in calm weather. Makanrushi is 28 km away from Onekotan. Makanrushi thus lies behind the main currently-active arc of Kuril Island volcanoes.

== History ==
Makanrushi appears to have never been inhabited. It appears on an official map showing the territories of Matsumae Domain, a feudal domain of Edo period Japan dated 1644, and these holdings were officially confirmed by the Tokugawa shogunate in 1715. Subsequently, claimed by the Empire of Russia, sovereignty initially passed to Russia under the terms of the Treaty of Shimoda, but was returned to the Empire of Japan per the Treaty of Saint Petersburg (1875) along with the rest of the Kuril islands. The island was formerly administered as part of Shimushu District of Nemuro Subprefecture of Hokkaidō. After World War II, the island came under the control of the Soviet Union, and is now administered as part of the Sakhalin Oblast of the Russian Federation.

On 10 August 1856, the ship Alexander Coffin (381 tons), Capt. Isaiah Purrington, of New Bedford, ran aground the island during a fog. The ship was lighted and sailed jury-rigged to Ayan, where she was condemned and sold at auction for $300.

== See also ==
- List of volcanoes in Russia
