= Second Kuril Strait =

Strait in Kuril Islands, Russia

Coordinates: 50.7166667°N 156.1666667°E

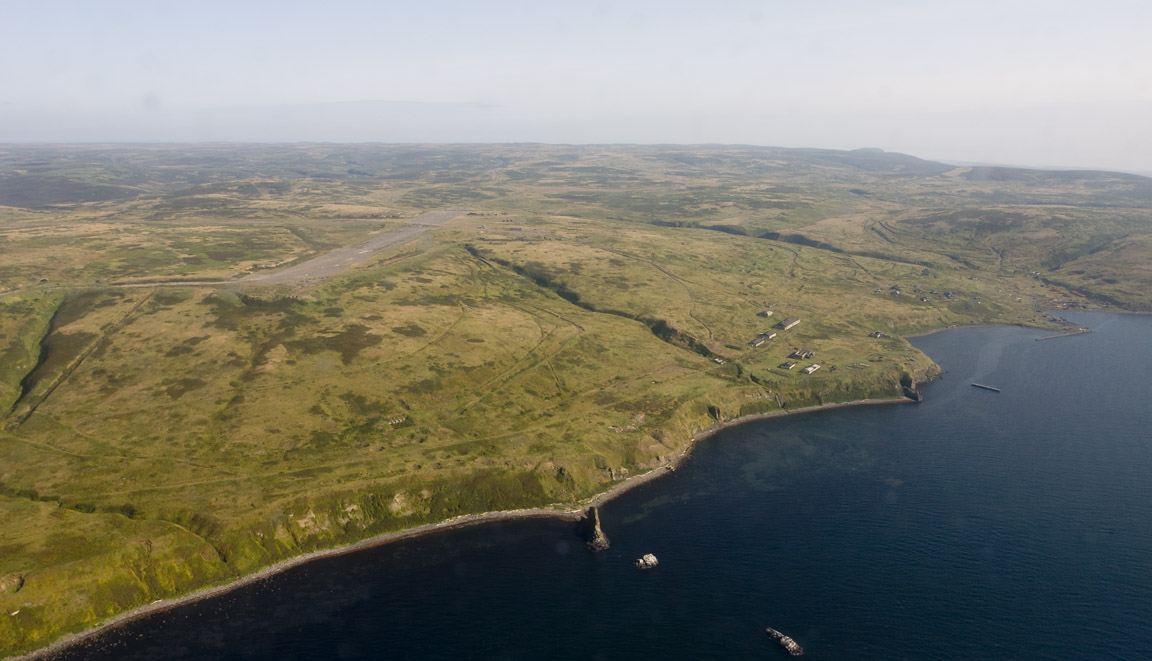
Shumshu Island

The Second Kuril Strait (Russian: Второй курильский пролив) is a strait which separates the islands of Paramushir and Shumshu in the Kuril Islands, Russia. There is a lighthouse for shipping in the Strait at Shumshi island.

It is about 2 kilometres (1.2 mi) wide. The depth of water is typically 10 to 50 metres (30 to 160 ft).

There are a number of shipwrecks and decommissioned ships around the strait. The Empire of Japan constructed a small base adjacent to the Strait on Shumshu which was later used by the Russians.

There are sharks and rays presents.

Fishing vessels have been known to shelter in the strait.
