= Harimkotan =

Uninhabited island in the Kuril Island chain

Native name: Харимкотан (Russian); 春牟古丹島 (Japanese)
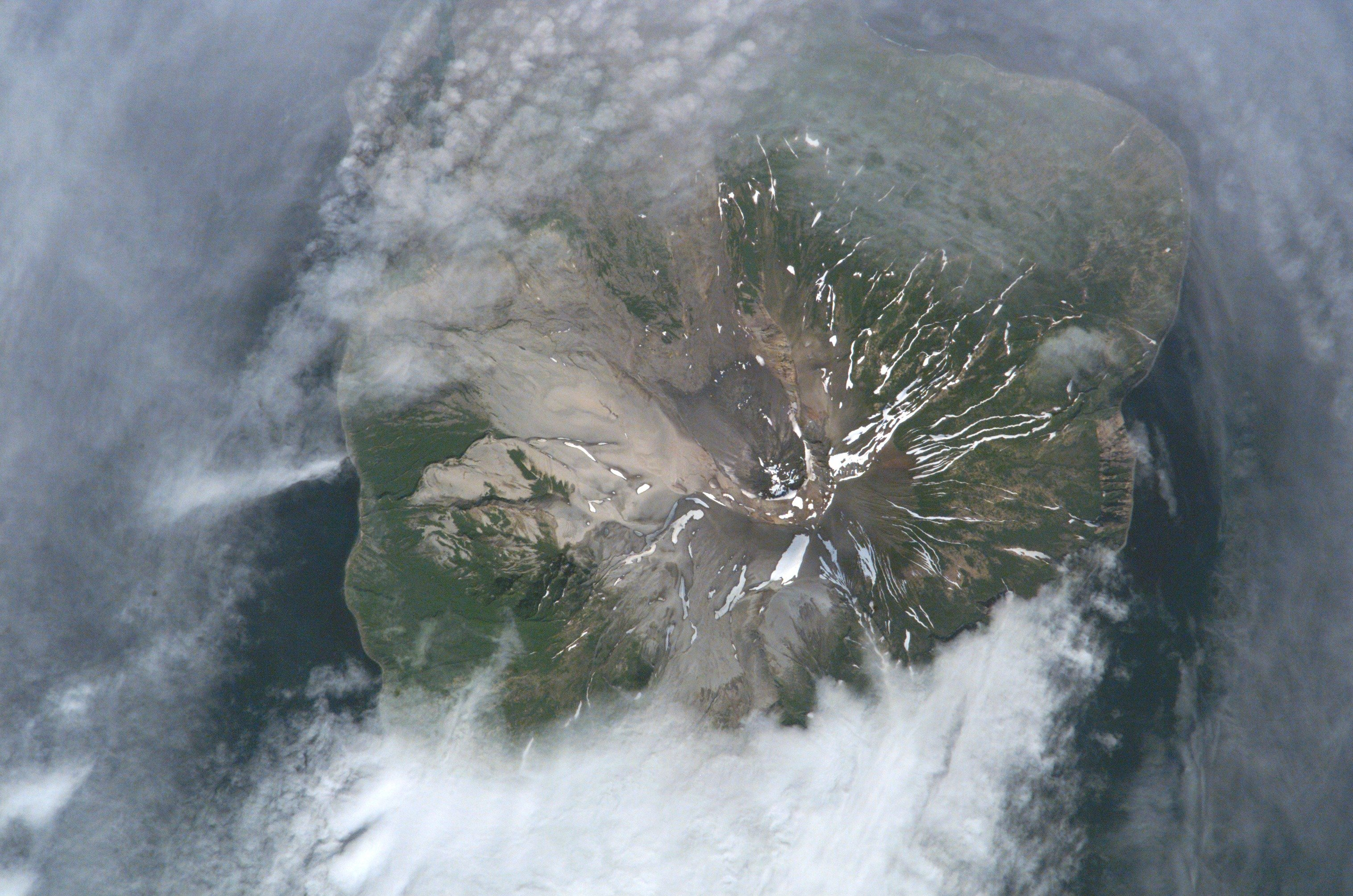
- Astronaut photograph of Harimkotan Island from International Space Station

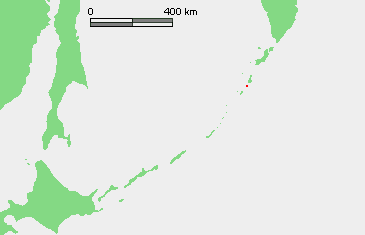

- Location within Sakhalin Oblast
- Interactive map of Harimkotan

Geography
- Location: Sea of Okhotsk
- Coordinates: 49.12°N 154.508°E
- Archipelago: Kuril Islands
- Area: 68 km^{2} (26 sq mi)
- Highest elevation: 1,145 m (3757 ft)
- Highest point: Pik Severgin

Administration
- Russia

Demographics
- Population: 0
- Ethnic groups: Ainu (formerly)

Harimkotan (Russian: Харимкотан, romanized: Kharimkotan; Japanese: 春牟古丹島, romanized: Harimukotan-tō / Harumukotan-tō; alternatively 加林古丹島, Karinkotan-tō) is an uninhabited volcanic island located 15 km (9 mi) from Onekotan near the northern end of the Kuril Islands chain in the Sea of Okhotsk in the northwest Pacific Ocean. Its name is derived from the Ainu language, from 'village of many Cardiocrinum.'

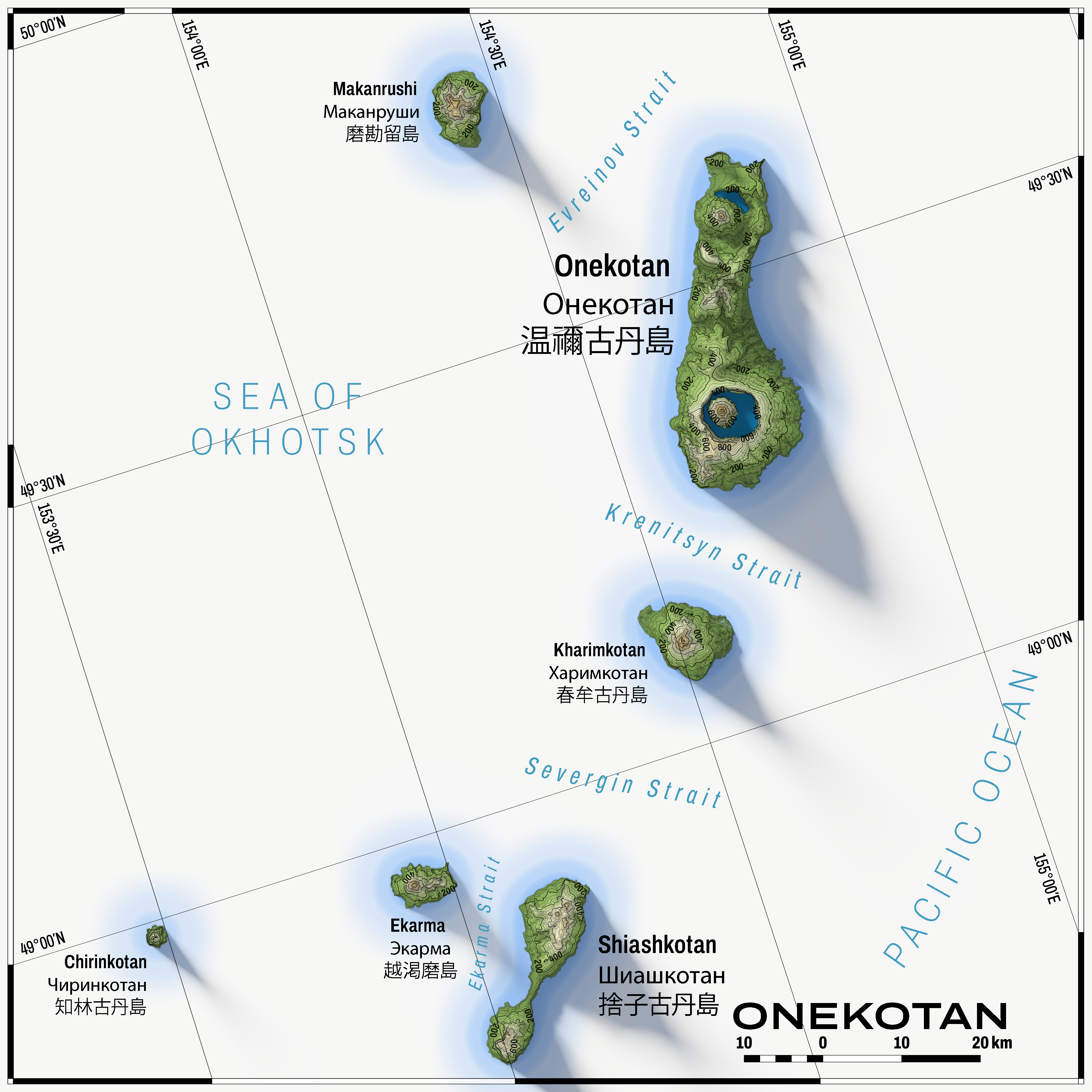
Topographic map of Onekotan with Harimkotan

== Geology ==
Harimkotan is roughly oval, measuring 8 kilometres (5.0 mi) by 12 kilometres (7.5 mi) with an area of 68 km^{2} (26 sq mi). The landscapes of the island are quite diverse. However, a significant part of the island's surface is covered with fine yellow ash, resembling desert dunes. On the northwestern cape are the ruins of an Ainu village and in the north of the island, on the shore of Severgin Bay, is the abandoned settlement of Severgino. There are a number of small freshwater lakes.

Harimkotan is separated by the Sixth Kuril Strait from Onekotan, located 15 kilometers to the northeast, and by the Severgin Strait from Shiashkotan, located 29 kilometers to the south-west. There are no convenient anchorage sites.

The island consists of a dormant stratovolcano, Pik Severgin -(Russian: влк.Севергина; Japanese 春牟古丹岳; Harikotan-dake), which rises to 1,157 m (3,796 ft) above sea level. The peak is marked by two horseshoe shaped volcanic craters created by the collapse of the volcano's upper slopes. Other evidence of the collapse can be seen on the peninsulas to the east and northwest which were formed by the debris. The volcano has erupted occasionally from the 18th century onwards, with the last recorded eruption in 1933 sending volcanic ash as far away as Paramushir. The collapse of the cone resulted in a debris-avalanche which subsequently caused a tsunami, which killed two people on Pamamushir. The path on which the debris took is visible on satellite imagery.

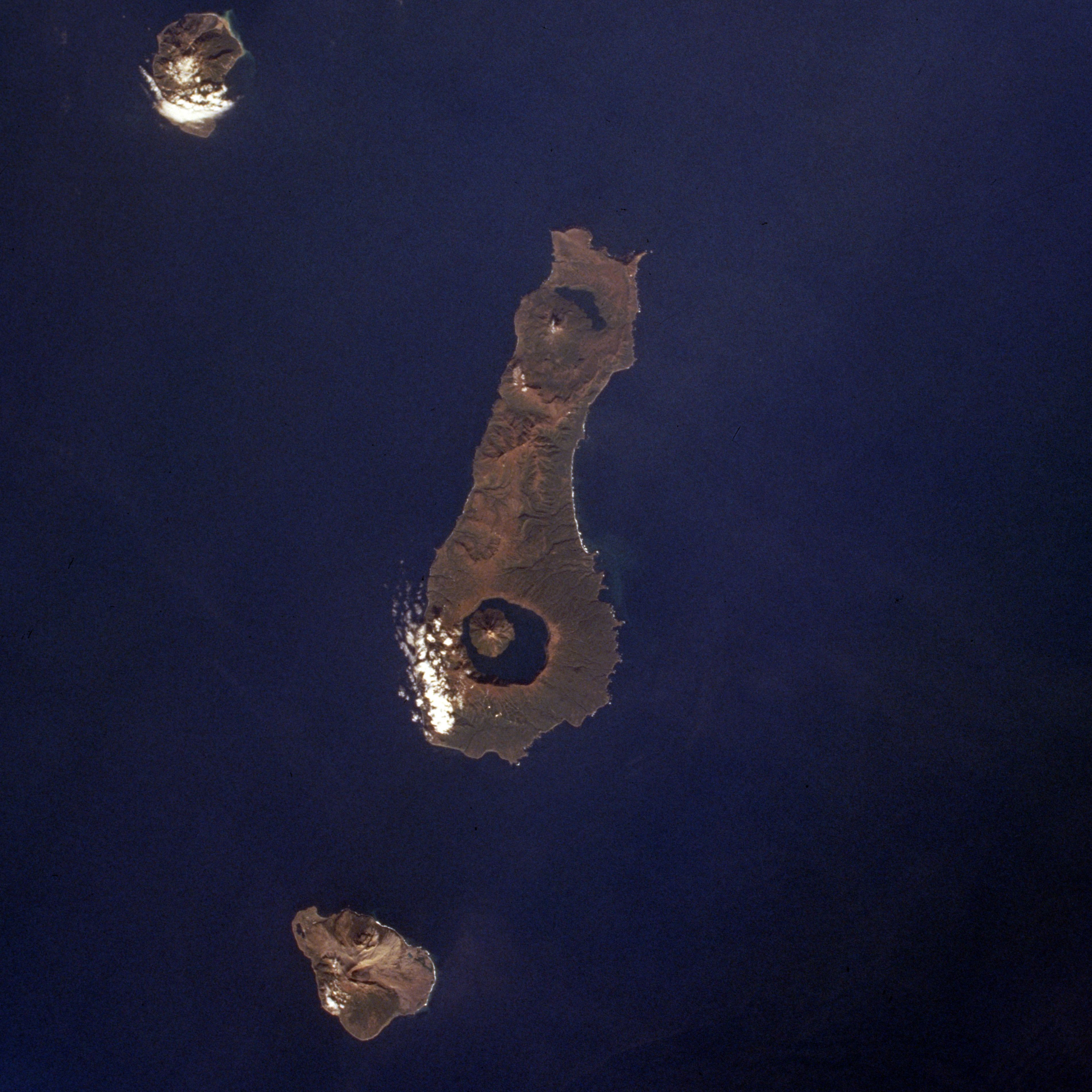
Onekotan Island (center), with Makanrushi at upper left and Harimkotan at bottom (south)

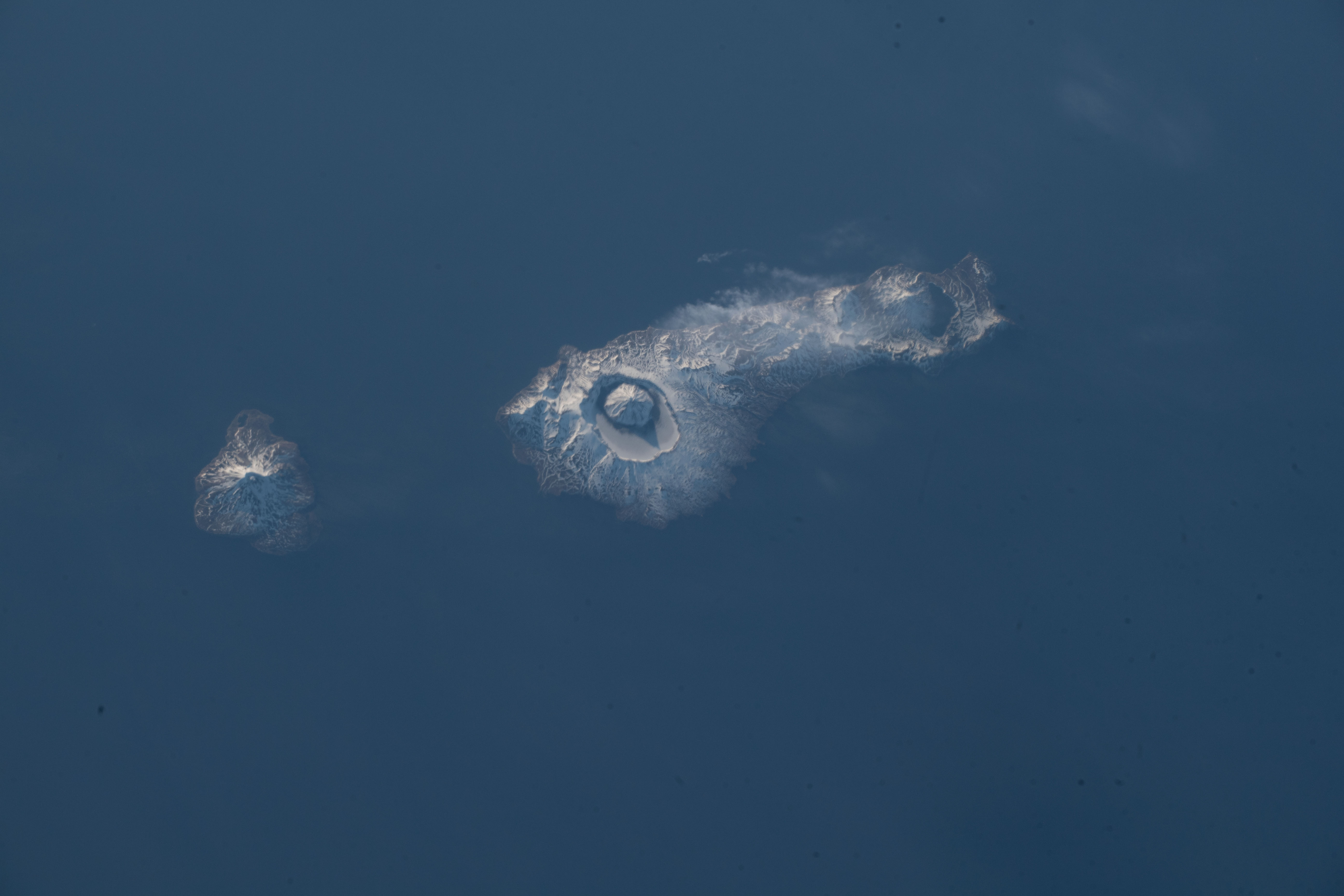
Harimkotan to the left (south) of Onekotan

== History ==
Harimkotan was inhabited by the Ainu at the time of European contact. The inhabitants subsisted by growing the edible bulbs of the Cardiocrinum, as well as fishing and hunting. The island appears on an official map showing the territories of Matsumae Domain, a feudal domain of Edo period Japan dated 1644, and these holdings were officially confirmed by the Tokugawa shogunate in 1715. However, by 1736 the Ainu adopted Russian Orthodoxy and were taxed as Russian subjects by the Empire of Russia. In 1811, it was reported that most could speak the Russian language and had adopted Russian names. In 1855, sovereignty under Russia was recognised by the terms of the Treaty of Shimoda, but the island was transferred to the Empire of Japan per the Treaty of Saint Petersburg (1875) along with the rest of the Kuril islands. In 1884, the Ainu on Harimkotan were resettled by the Japanese authorities to Shikotan. The island was formerly administered as part of Shimushu District of Nemuro Subprefecture of Hokkaidō. In January 1933, a Japanese settlement was destroyed by an eruption of the volcano, and the settlement was abandoned by the Japanese. After World War II, the island came under the control of the Soviet Union, and is now administered as part of the Sakhalin Oblast of the Russian Federation.

== See also ==
- List of volcanoes in Russia
