= Fourth Kuril Strait =

Strait in Kuril Islands, Russia

Coordinates: 49°50′N 155°00′E

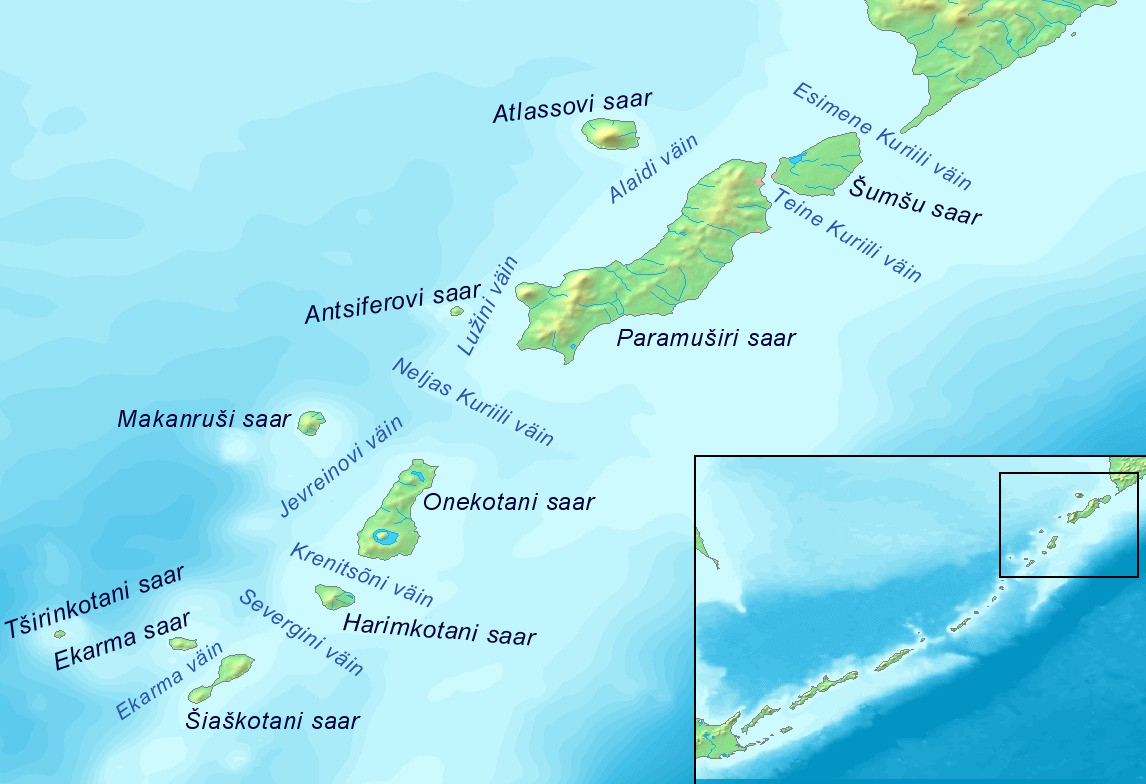
A map showing the northern and central Kuril Islands, highlighting the geographic context of the Fourth Kuril Strait

The Fourth Kuril Strait (Russian: Четвёртый курильский пролив) is a very deep strait separating the islands of Onekotan and Paramushir in the Kuril Islands, Russia. It is 46.7 km (about 29 mi) wide. It was formerly known as the Amphitrite Strait. The flood tidal current in the strait sets west-northwest, while the ebb flows in the opposite direction. These currents may reach over two knots.

== History ==
Between 1849 and 1874, the strait was the most common route for American whaleships entering and exiting the Sea of Okhotsk on their way to and from cruises for bowhead and right whales. They called it the 50 Passage or Paramushir Passage. Some even chased right whales on passage through the strait.
