= San Severo (disambiguation) =

San Severo (which means "Saint Severus") may refer to:

- San Severo, a town in Apulia, southern Italy
- San Severo, a frazione of Cotignola in the Province of Ravenna, Emilia-Romagna, northern Italy
- San Severo, a frazione of the commune of Arezzo in Tuscany, Italy
- San Severo, in Córdoba, Argentina
- San Severo, Venice refers to a razed church in the Sestiere of Castello, Venice
