= Severo-Zapadny =

Severo-Zapadny may refer to:

- Northwestern Federal District (Severo-Zapadny federalny okrug), a federal district of Russia
- Northwestern economic region (Severo-Zapadny ekonomichesky rayon), an economic region of Russia
- North-Western Administrative Okrug (Severo-Zapadny administrativny okrug), an administrative okrug of Moscow, Russia
- Severo-Zapadny City District, a city district of Vladikavkaz, Republic of North Ossetia-Alania, Russia
