= Paramushir =

Island in the northern Kuril Islands

Native name: Парамушир (Russian); 幌筵島 (Japanese)
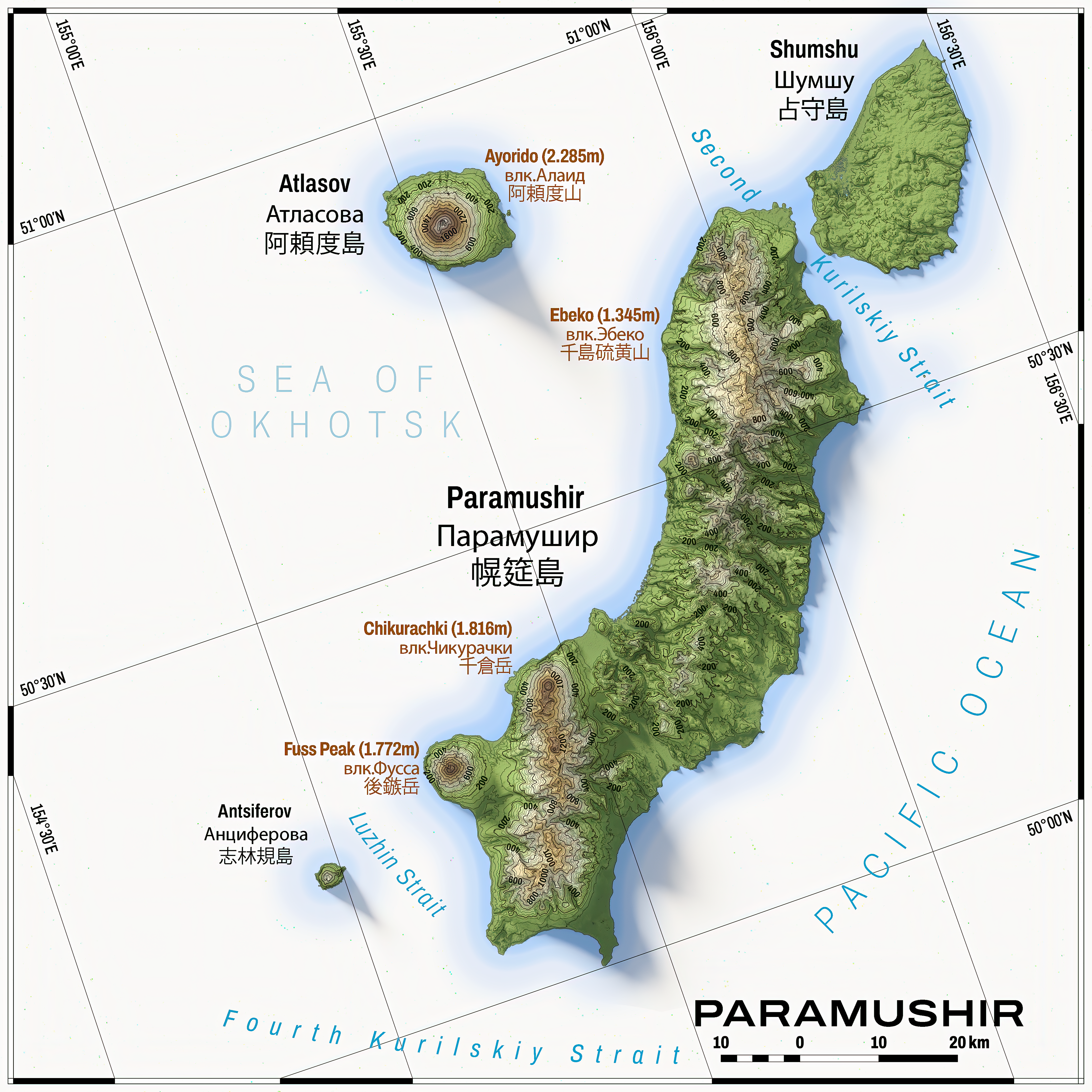
- Map of Paramushir Island

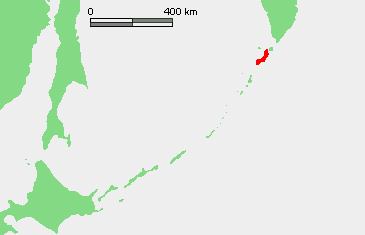

- Location within Sakhalin Oblast
- Interactive map of Paramushir

Geography
- Location: Pacific Ocean
- Coordinates: 50°20′N 155°45′E
- Archipelago: Kuril Island
- Area: 2,053 km^{2} (793 sq mi)
- Length: 100 km (60 mi)
- Width: 20 km (12 mi)
- Highest elevation: 1,816 m (5958 ft)
- Highest point: Chikurachki

Administration
- Russia
- Oblast: Sakhalin Oblast
- District: Severo-Kurilsky
- Largest settlement: Severo-Kurilsk (pop. 2592)

Paramushir (Russian: Парамушир, romanized: Paramushir; Japanese: 幌筵島, romanized: Paramushiru-tō) is a volcanic island in the northern portion of the Kuril Islands chain in the Sea of Okhotsk in the northwest Pacific Ocean. It is separated from Shumshu by the very narrow Second Kuril Strait in the northeast 2.5 km (1.6 mi), from Antsiferov by the Luzhin Strait (15 km (9.3 mi)) to the southwest, from Atlasov in the northwest by 20 km (12 mi), and from Onekotan in the south by the 40 km (25 mi) wide Fourth Kuril Strait. Its northern tip is 39 km (24 mi) from Cape Lopatka at the southern tip of the Kamchatka Peninsula. Severo-Kurilsk, the administrative center of the Severo-Kurilsky district, is the only permanently populated settlement on Paramushir island.

== Geography and geology ==
Paramushir is roughly rectangular and is the second largest of the Kuril Islands with an area of 2,053 square kilometres (793 sq mi). Geologically, Paramushir is a continuous chain of 23 volcanoes. At least five of them are active, and exceed 1,000 m (3,281 ft):

- Chikurachki, (Russian: влк.Чикурачки, Japanese: 千倉岳; Chikura-dake) with a height of 1,816 m (5,958 ft) is the highest peak on Paramushir and the third highest in the Kuril Islands. It has erupted in 1690, 1853, 1859, 1933 and several times between 1957 and 2008. During the most recent eruption in August 2008, the volcanic ash reached the town of Severo-Kurilsk located 60 km (37 mi) north-east. The previous eruption took place on March 4, 2007, when a 1.5 km (0.93 mi) high plume of ash was emitted that trailed for several hundred kilometers into the neighboring waters.
- Fuss Peak, (Russian: влк.Фусса, Japanese: 後鏃岳; Shiriyajiri-dake) with a height of 1,772 m (5,814 ft) is a conical stratovolcano. It has erupted in 1742, 1854 and 1934.
- Lomonosov Group, (Russian: влк.Ломоносова, Japanese: 冠岳; Kanmuridake) with a height of 1,681 m (5,515 ft) is part of the Chikurachki group.
- Karpinsky Group, (Russian: влк.Карпинского, Japanese: 白煙山; Shirokemuri-yama) with a height of 1,345 m (4,413 ft) has erupted in 1957.
- Ebeko, (Russian: влк.Эбеко, Japanese: 千島硫黄山; Chishima Iōyama) with a height of 1,345 m (4,413 ft) has erupted numerous times, most recently in 1990. The central crater of Ebeko is filled by a caldera lake about 20 m (66 ft) deep.

== Climate and flora, fauna, and funga ==
Paramushir has a sub-arctic climate strongly modulated by the cooling effects of the North Pacific Oyashio Current. The arboreal flora of Paramushir is consequently limited to dense, stunted copses of Siberian dwarf pine and shrubby alder. The alpine tundra which dominates the landscape produces plentiful edible mushrooms and berries, especially lingonberry, Arctic raspberry, whortleberry and crowberry. Red fox, Arctic hare and ermine are notably abundant and hunted by the inhabitants. The island also supports a population of brown bears. In the spring crested auklet nest on the island. The straits between Paramushir and Shumshu island support a notably dense population of sea otters; harbor seals are also common. North Pacific right whales, one of the rarest and the most endangered whale species are known to appear in the surrounding waters.

Several species of charr and Pacific salmon spawn in its rivers, notably in the Tukharka river, which at 20 km (12 mi) is the longest river on the island.

== History ==
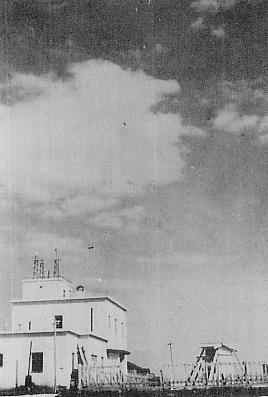
The Paramushiru Weather Station under Japanese control

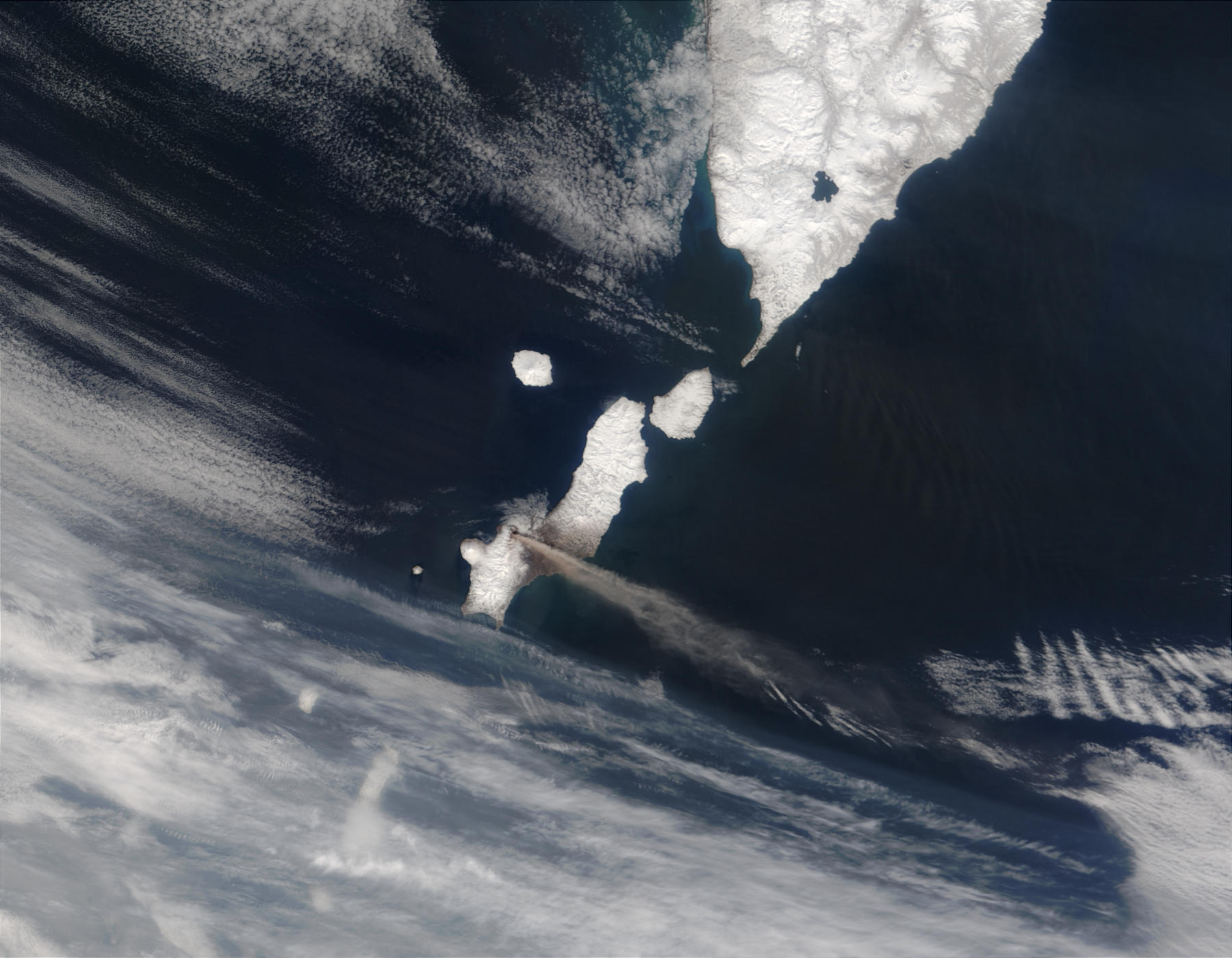
Chikurachki eruption, 2003 (MODIS image)

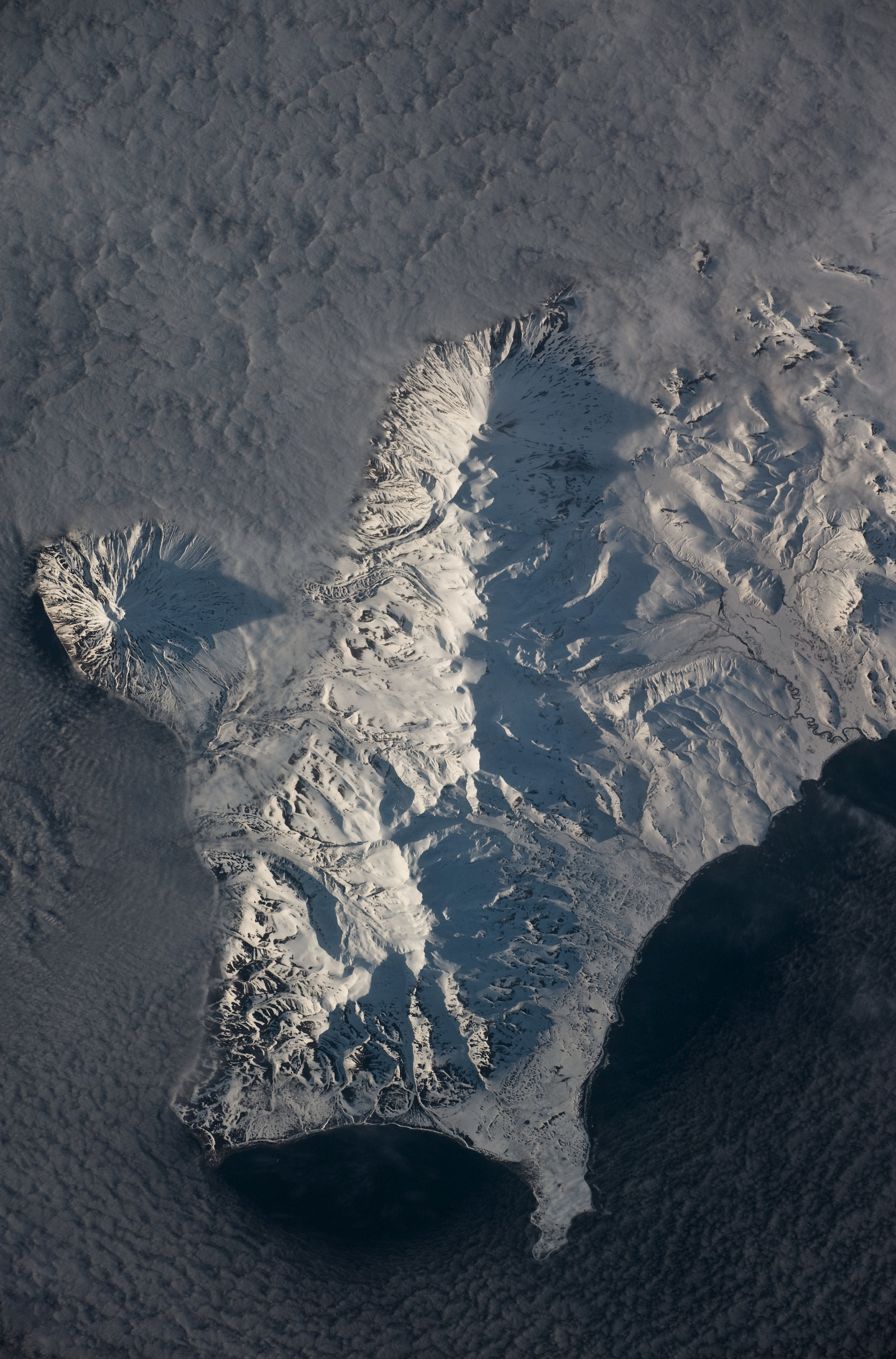
The southern end of Paramushir Island after snowfall

Paramushir was inhabited by the Ainu at the time of European contact. The island appears on an official map showing the territories of Matsumae Domain, a feudal domain of Edo period Japan dated 1644. Russian fur traders are known to have visited the island in 1711 and 1713, and Russian Orthodox missionaries established a church in 1747 to convert the local inhabitants. Imperial Russia's claim of sovereignty over the island was initially confirmed under the terms of the Treaty of Shimoda in 1855, but was transferred to the Empire of Japan per the 1875 Treaty of Saint Petersburg, along with the rest of the Kuril Islands. The Japanese established a settlement, Kashiwabara, on the site of the largest Ainu village, which became the major port on the island, and a center for the commercial fishing industry. The island was administered as part of Shimushu District of Nemuro Subprefecture of Hokkaido.

During World War II the island was strongly garrisoned by both the Imperial Japanese Army and Imperial Japanese Navy. The headquarters of the IJA 91st Infantry Division, responsible for defense of the northern Kurils, was established at Kashiwabara, and numerous coastal artillery positions and fortified bunkers were constructed in various locations around the island. In addition, the Imperial Japanese Army constructed four airfields: Kashiwabara Airfield in the northeast with Ki-43 Oscars, Kakumabestu Airfield on the southwest coast with a 3,800 ft (1,158 m) runway and Ki-44 Tojos, Kitanodai Airfield on the northeast coast with a 4,000 ft (1,219 m) runway, and Suribachi Airfield, an auxiliary base in the center of the south coast with two runways. The Imperial Japanese Navy had Musashi Airfield on the south-western tip of the island with two 4,000 ft (1,219 m) runways, one 4,300 ft (1,311 m) and another 4,200 ft (1,280 m), operating a variety of aircraft as well as a radar site. These bases were subject to sporadic air raids from the US Army Air Forces and US Navy based in the Aleutian Islands from 1943 until the end of the war.

Soviet troops landed on Paramushir on August 18, 1945, during the Invasion of the Kuril Islands, and combat operations continued through August 23, ending with the surrender of the surviving members of the Japanese garrison. The Soviets forcibly deported the remaining Japanese civilian inhabitants and sent the prisoners of war to labor camps. Kashiwabara was renamed Severo-Kurilsk and the island annexed by the Soviet Union in 1946. Japan formally gave up sovereignty over the island under the terms of the San Francisco Peace Treaty of 1951.

In November 1952, Severo-Kurilsk was destroyed by the 1952 Severo-Kurilsk tsunami and was rebuilt in another location. Following the dissolution of the Soviet Union in 1990, the population of the island has decreased (2592 in 2002 census, 5180 in the 1989 census), and villages that once lined the coast are now ghost towns. This is due in part to the crash of the formerly lucrative herring fishery, to the extremely destructive tsunami of 1952, and general economic hardships in the more remote reaches of Russia since the fall of the Soviet Union. The island is now administered as part of the Sakhalin Oblast of the Russian Federation.

== See also ==
- List of volcanoes in Russia
- List of islands of Russia
- Organization of Kita and Minami Fortresses
