= Severo-Kurilsk =

Town in Sakhalin Oblast, Russia

Severo-Kurilsk Северо-Курильск
- Town
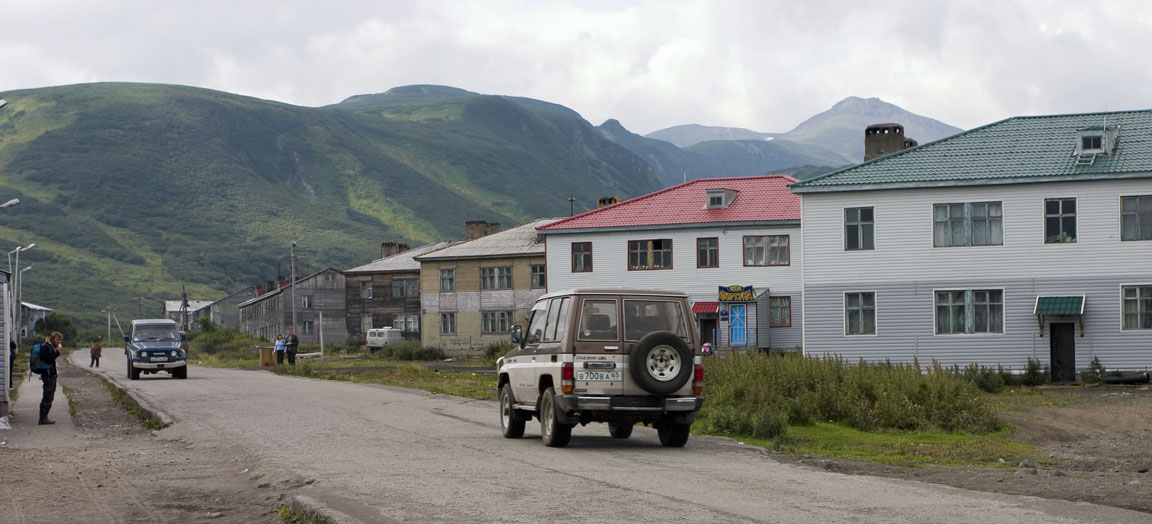
- Main street of Severo-Kurilsk

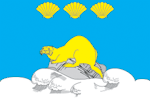
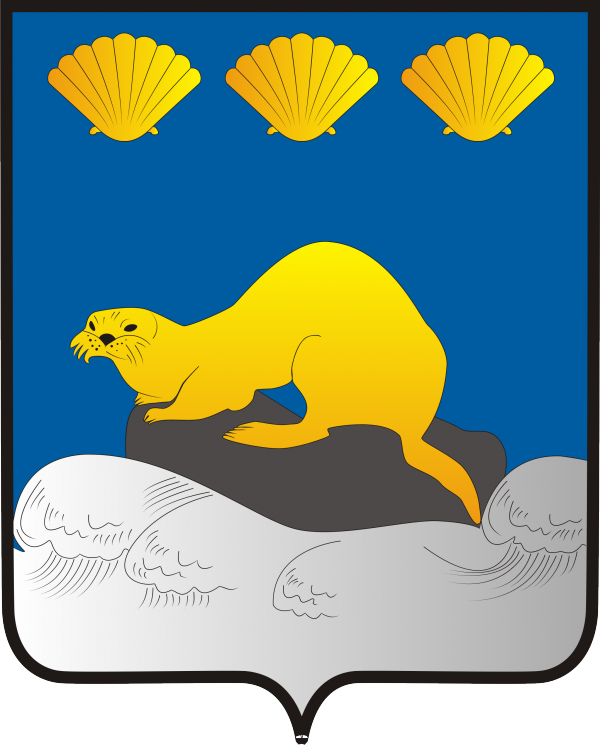
- Flag Coat of arms
- Interactive map of Severo-Kurilsk
- Location of Severo-Kurilsk Severo-Kurilsk (Sakhalin Oblast)
- Coordinates: 50°40′N 156°07′E
- Country: Russia
- Federal subject: Sakhalin Oblast
- Administrative district: Severo-Kurilsky District
- Elevation: 30 m (98 ft)

Population (2010 Census)
  - Total: 2,536
  - Estimate (2025): 2,314 (−8.8%)

Administrative status
  - Capital of: Severo-Kurilsky District

Municipal status
  - Urban okrug: Severo-Kurilsky Urban Okrug
  - Capital of: Severo-Kurilsky Urban Okrug
- Time zone: UTC+11 (MSK+8)
- Postal code: 694550
- Dialing code: +7 42453
- OKTMO ID: 64743000001

Severo-Kurilsk (Russian: Се́веро-Кури́льск), formerly Kashiwabara (Japanese: 柏原), is a town and the administrative center of Severo-Kurilsky District of Sakhalin Oblast, Russia, located in the northern part of the Kuril Islands, on the island of Paramushir. Population: 2,536 (2010 census); 2,592 (2002 census); 5,180 (1989 Soviet census).

== History ==
On November 5, 1952, a magnitude 8.8–9.0 earthquake struck off the coast of the Kamchatka Peninsula. Severo-Kurilsk was completely destroyed by the resulting tsunami, killing at least 2,336 people. Following this event, the town was rebuilt on higher ground to prevent damage from future tsunamis.

On July 30, 2025, an 8.8 magnitude earthquake again occurred off the coast of the Kamchatka Peninsula, causing a tsunami that partly flooded Severo-Kurilsk's port and a fish processing plant. The earthquake itself severely affected the town, damaging apartment buildings, social facilities and public utilities, however no deaths were reported.

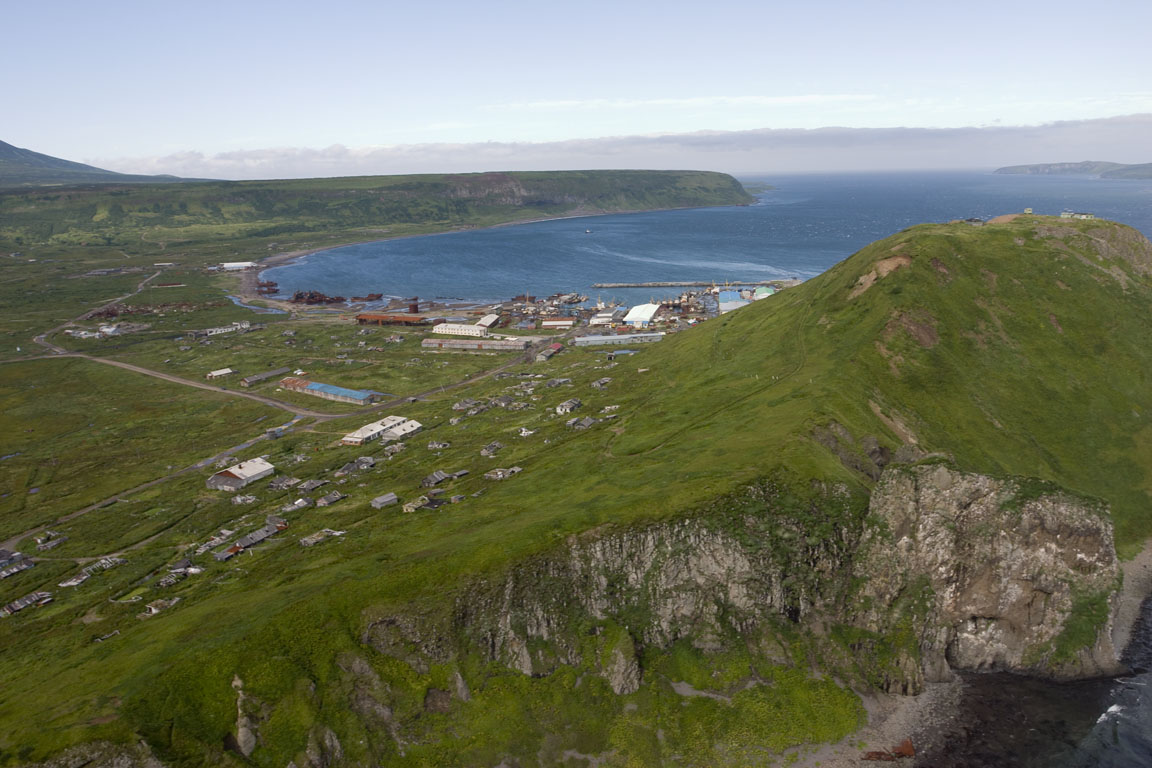
View of the original site of Severo-Kurilsk

== Administrative and municipal status ==
Within the framework of administrative divisions, Severo-Kurilsk serves as the administrative center of Severo-Kurilsky District and is subordinated to it. As a municipal division, the town of Severo-Kurilsk and one rural locality of Severo-Kurilsky District are incorporated as Severo-Kurilsky Urban Okrug.

== Economy ==
Commercial fishing is virtually the only industry in the town.

== Climate ==
Severo-Kurilsk has a subarctic climate (Köppen Dfc). The monthly average temperature is greater than 10 degrees Celsius only in August and September. Due to the influence of the cold current of the Oyashio current, it is cold and humid all year round. Severo-Kurilsk is above the 0°C isotherm and has very rarely, sporadic permafrost during the winter. Despite its northern latitude, temperatures are extremely mild as the ocean regulates the temperature. The annual precipitation is more than five times that of Siberia. Winter lasts from December through April, the months where temperatures average below freezing. The summers are short, cold, and mostly cloudy. Winters are long, freezing, snowy, extremely windy, and overcast. During the winter season, Snow is extremely common and can be found blanketing the ground. Over the course of the year, the temperature typically varies from −6.4°C to 15.2°C and is rarely below −15°C or above 22°C.

Based on the tourism score, the best time of year to visit Severo-Kurilsk for warm-weather activities is for the entire month of August.

Climate data for Severo-Kurilsk (1991–2020, extremes 1948–present)
Month	Jan	Feb	Mar	Apr	May	Jun	Jul	Aug	Sep	Oct	Nov	Dec	Year
Record high °C (°F)	6.0 (42.8)	6.0 (42.8)	9.2 (48.6)	14.6 (58.3)	19.7 (67.5)	24.3 (75.7)	29.4 (84.9)	25.1 (77.2)	24.5 (76.1)	17.8 (64.0)	12.2 (54.0)	7.9 (46.2)	29.4 (84.9)
Mean daily maximum °C (°F)	−1.8 (28.8)	−2.4 (27.7)	−0.8 (30.6)	1.9 (35.4)	5.7 (42.3)	10.6 (51.1)	13.5 (56.3)	15.2 (59.4)	13.8 (56.8)	8.9 (48.0)	3.4 (38.1)	−0.5 (31.1)	5.6 (42.1)
Daily mean °C (°F)	−3.7 (25.3)	−4.4 (24.1)	−3.0 (26.6)	−0.3 (31.5)	2.9 (37.2)	6.9 (44.4)	10.0 (50.0)	11.7 (53.1)	10.6 (51.1)	6.3 (43.3)	1.3 (34.3)	−2.4 (27.7)	3.0 (37.4)
Mean daily minimum °C (°F)	−5.6 (21.9)	−6.4 (20.5)	−5.0 (23.0)	−2.1 (28.2)	0.8 (33.4)	4.2 (39.6)	7.5 (45.5)	9.1 (48.4)	7.8 (46.0)	3.8 (38.8)	−0.8 (30.6)	−4.5 (23.9)	0.7 (33.3)
Record low °C (°F)	−22.0 (−7.6)	−18.9 (−2.0)	−17.6 (0.3)	−10.7 (12.7)	−6.0 (21.2)	−1.9 (28.6)	1.6 (34.9)	2.0 (35.6)	−1.0 (30.2)	−4.0 (24.8)	−12.2 (10.0)	−16.1 (3.0)	−22.0 (−7.6)
Average precipitation mm (inches)	126 (5.0)	137 (5.4)	152 (6.0)	116 (4.6)	113 (4.4)	143 (5.6)	160 (6.3)	163 (6.4)	183 (7.2)	246 (9.7)	253 (10.0)	185 (7.3)	1,977 (77.8)
Average extreme snow depth cm (inches)	64 (25)	86 (34)	103 (41)	98 (39)	27 (11)	0 (0)	0 (0)	0 (0)	0 (0)	0 (0)	10 (3.9)	35 (14)	103 (41)
Average rainy days	1	0.3	1	7	16	17	18	20	22	25	12	4	143
Average snowy days	30	29	29	24	11	1	0.2	0.1	0.2	6	24	30	184.5
Average relative humidity (%)	75	77	77	79	82	85	89	87	80	76	74	74	79
Average dew point °C (°F)	−8 (18)	−8 (18)	−6 (21)	−4 (25)	0 (32)	4 (39)	8 (46)	10 (50)	10 (50)	2 (36)	−3 (27)	−6 (21)	0 (32)
Source: Pogoda.ru.net

== Sister city ==
- Nemuro, Hokkaido, Japan
