= Severo Eulálio =

Brazilian politician (born 1983)

President of the Legislative Assembly of Piauí
- Incumbent
- Assumed office 3 February 2025
- Preceded by: Franzé Silva

Personal details
- Born: 7 October 1983 (age 42)
- Party: Brazilian Democratic Movement
- Parent: Kléber Eulálio (father)
- Relatives: Severo Eulálio (grandfather)

Severo Maria Eulálio Neto (born 7 October 1983) is a Brazilian politician serving as a member of the Legislative Assembly of Piauí since 2015. He has served as president of the assembly since 2025.
