= Cape Lopatka =

Geographical feature in Kamchatka, Russia

Coordinates: 50.87°N 156.67°E

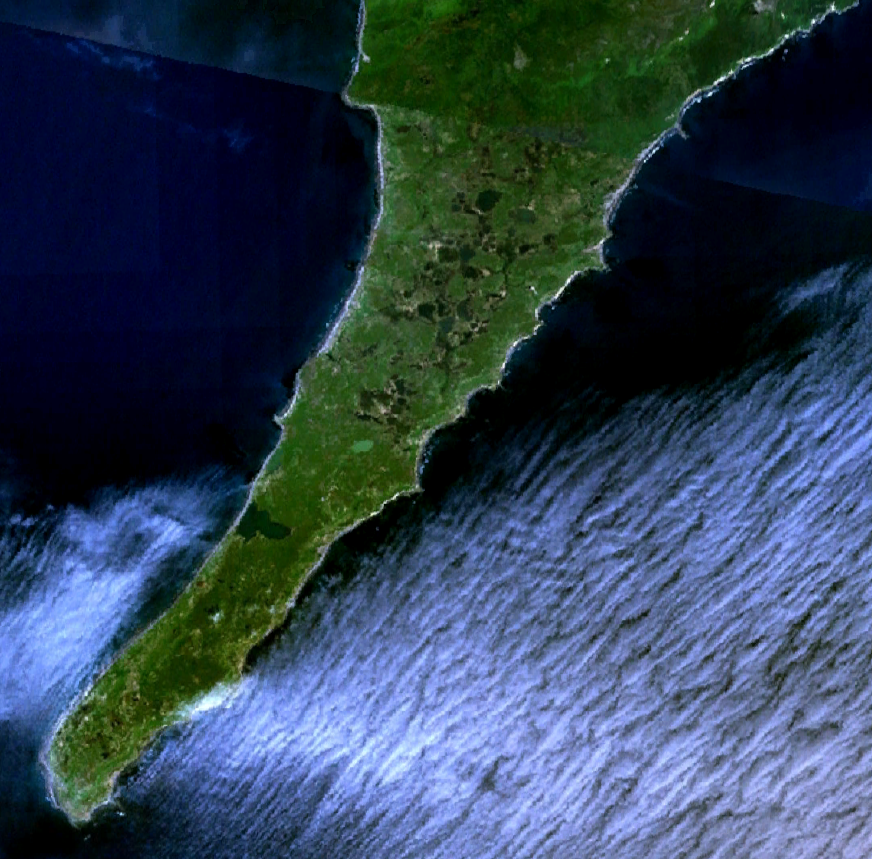
Cape Lopatka.

Cape Lopatka (Russian: мыс Лопатка, romanized: Mys Lopatka) is the southernmost point of Kamchatka Peninsula, Russia, with the rural locality of Semenovka at its southernmost point. Cape Lopatka lies about 11 km (7 mi) north of Shumshu, the northernmost island of the Kuril Islands. Cape Lopatka also serves as the northernmost area of habitation by the Ainu people.

In 1737, Cape Lopatka's highest tsunami was recorded at 64 m (210 ft), washing over the peninsula, triggered by a 9.0-9.3 M_{W} earthquake.

== Climate ==
In spite of its temperate latitude, the powerful Oyashio Current on the western flank of the Aleutian Low gives Lopatka a chilly and very wet polar climate that borders extremely closely on the subarctic (Köppen Dfc/ET), for which it just qualifies due to its 9.9 °C (49.8 °F) August means, which in low-lying areas would be expected only at latitudes about 20° or 2,200 kilometres (1,370 mi) further north. Unlike typical polar climates, however, the winters are only moderately severe, and there is no permafrost since the mean annual temperature is around 2.0 °C (35.6 °F), whilst temperatures have never fallen below −21.0 °C (−6 °F). However, the extreme winds make it feel much colder. Summers are mild but extraordinarily cloudy, with annual sunshine hours about 1,050 per year, which is comparable to Reykjavík or the extremely foggy Sichuan Basin. Sunshine is most likely in the wettest months of September and October, when the heavy rain removes the low-level fog, but clear days are extremely rare at any time of year. As of 2019, this is still yet to result in any high above 20 °C (68 °F).

Climate data for Cape Lopatka (1991-2020 normals, extremes 1948-present)
Month	Jan	Feb	Mar	Apr	May	Jun	Jul	Aug	Sep	Oct	Nov	Dec	Year
Record high °C (°F)	4.3 (39.7)	9.2 (48.6)	5.0 (41.0)	10.5 (50.9)	13.5 (56.3)	16.6 (61.9)	18.5 (65.3)	17.8 (64.0)	17.8 (64.0)	16.1 (61.0)	10.4 (50.7)	7.2 (45.0)	18.5 (65.3)
Mean maximum °C (°F)	1.4 (34.5)	0.4 (32.7)	1.2 (34.2)	2.8 (37.0)	7.8 (46.0)	11.5 (52.7)	14.1 (57.4)	15.0 (59.0)	14.4 (57.9)	10.8 (51.4)	7.1 (44.8)	2.3 (36.1)	15.5 (59.9)
Mean daily maximum °C (°F)	−2.4 (27.7)	−3.2 (26.2)	−1.8 (28.8)	0.2 (32.4)	3.3 (37.9)	7.0 (44.6)	10.2 (50.4)	11.9 (53.4)	11.1 (52.0)	7.5 (45.5)	2.5 (36.5)	−1.1 (30.0)	3.8 (38.8)
Daily mean °C (°F)	−3.9 (25.0)	−4.7 (23.5)	−3.3 (26.1)	−0.9 (30.4)	2.0 (35.6)	5.4 (41.7)	8.6 (47.5)	10.2 (50.4)	9.4 (48.9)	5.9 (42.6)	0.8 (33.4)	−2.7 (27.1)	2.2 (36.0)
Mean daily minimum °C (°F)	−5.5 (22.1)	−6.1 (21.0)	−4.7 (23.5)	−2.1 (28.2)	0.5 (32.9)	3.7 (38.7)	6.9 (44.4)	8.6 (47.5)	7.7 (45.9)	4.2 (39.6)	−0.8 (30.6)	−4.1 (24.6)	0.7 (33.3)
Mean minimum °C (°F)	−10.3 (13.5)	−11.0 (12.2)	−8.8 (16.2)	−5.0 (23.0)	−1.6 (29.1)	0.9 (33.6)	4.4 (39.9)	6.8 (44.2)	5.0 (41.0)	0.6 (33.1)	−4.9 (23.2)	−8.3 (17.1)	−11.5 (11.3)
Record low °C (°F)	−21.0 (−5.8)	−18.7 (−1.7)	−17.3 (0.9)	−10.0 (14.0)	−5.0 (23.0)	−1.3 (29.7)	1.0 (33.8)	3.5 (38.3)	2.3 (36.1)	−2.8 (27.0)	−8.9 (16.0)	−13.2 (8.2)	−21.0 (−5.8)
Average precipitation mm (inches)	48.8 (1.92)	41.2 (1.62)	49.6 (1.95)	37.5 (1.48)	43.7 (1.72)	53.5 (2.11)	80.7 (3.18)	94.7 (3.73)	93.7 (3.69)	101.6 (4.00)	82.8 (3.26)	58.7 (2.31)	780.6 (30.73)
Average precipitation days (≥ 1.0 mm)	10.41	8.08	9.83	8.39	7.66	7.79	9.42	9.68	10.05	13.08	12.74	12.12	119.00
Mean monthly sunshine hours	65	83	122	112	87	72	61	86	131	115	66	52	1,052
Source 1: Météo climat stats
Source 2: Météo Climat
