= Treaty of Saint Petersburg (1875) =

Territorial settlement between Japan and Russia

Treaty for the Exchange of Sakhalin for the Kurile Islands
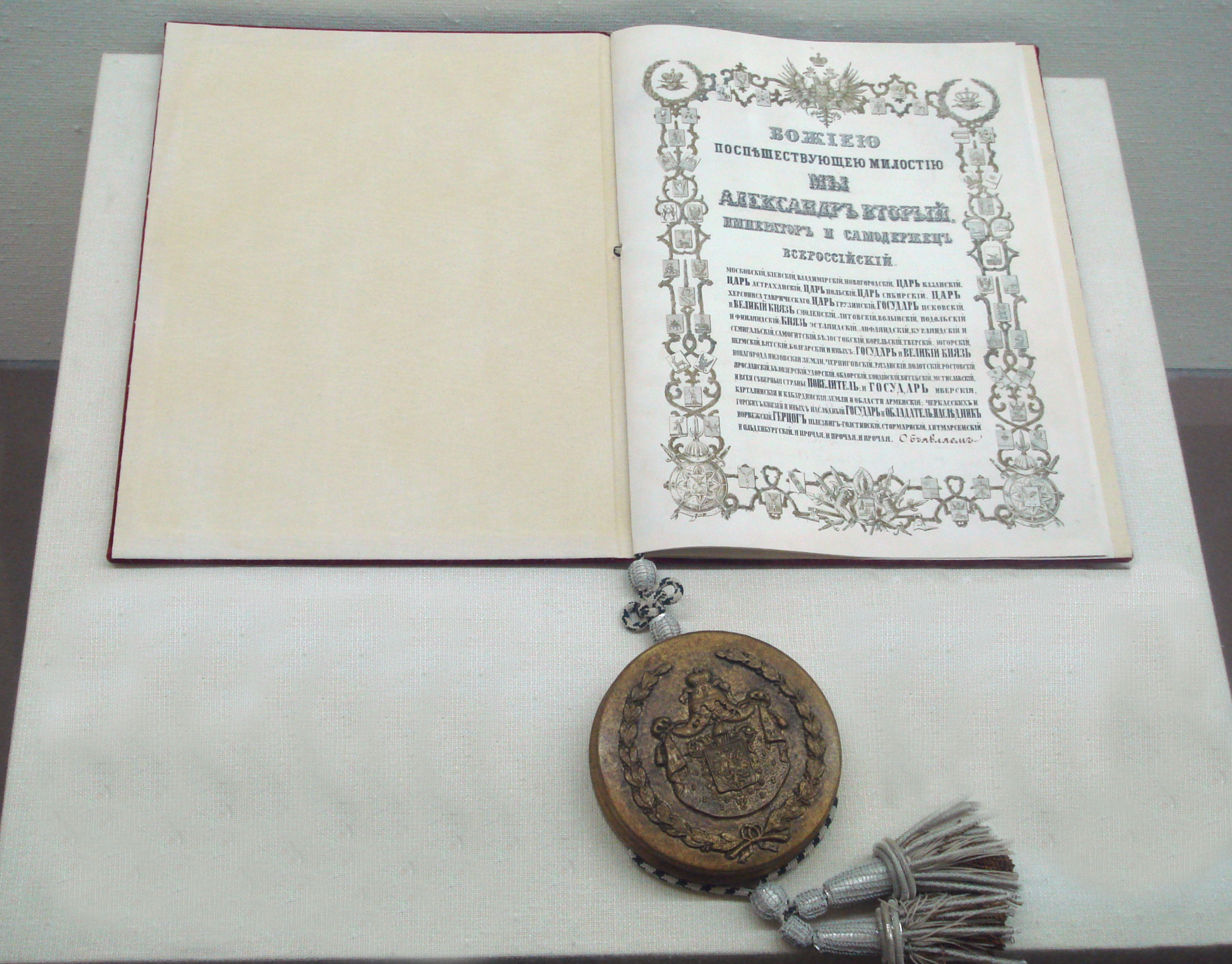
- Signed: 25 April (7 May) 1875
- Location: Saint Petersburg, Russia
- Signatories: Alexander Gorchakov; Takeaki Enomoto
- Parties: Russia; Japan
- Language: French

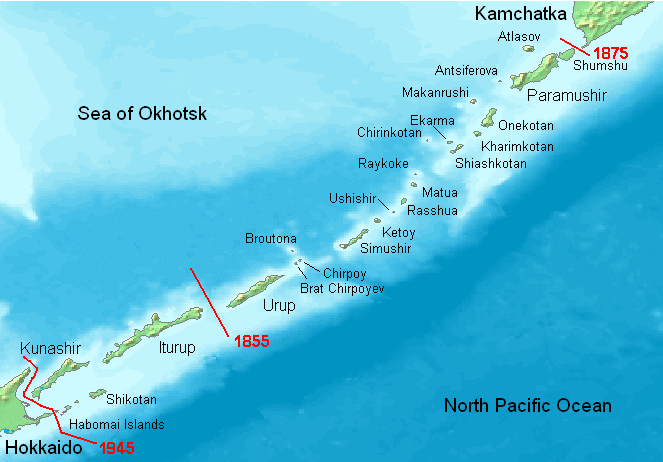
Border changes in the Kurils

（including de facto control）

The Treaty of Saint Petersburg (Japanese: 樺太・千島交換条約, romanized: Karafuto-Chishima Kōkan Jōyaku; Russian: Петербургский договор) between the Empire of Japan and the Russian Empire was signed on 7 May 1875, and its ratifications exchanged at Tokyo on 22 August 1875. The treaty itself went into effect in 1877.

Its terms stipulated that Japan cede to Russia the part of Sakhalin island it then owned in exchange for the group of the Kuril Islands owned by Russia (between Iturup island and the Kamchatka Peninsula). Consequently, Sakhalin island as a whole became Russian territory, and the entire Kuril archipelago Japanese territory.

The authentic text of the treaty is written in French. Differences with its Japanese translation contributed to the controversy on what constitutes the Kuril Islands, claims to which Japan renounced in 1951 by the Treaty of San Francisco. The Treaty of Saint Petersburg (1875) is part of an ongoing, and long-standing, territorial dispute between Russia and Japan over the jurisdiction of the Kuril Islands.

== Background ==
=== Golovnin Incident ===
In 1811, Vasily Golovnin, a Russian explorer tasked by Tsar Alexander I with mapping the Kuril Islands, was captured by the Japanese. When Golovnin and his crew aboard the ship Diana approached Kunashir Island, they were taken ashore and imprisoned for violating Sakoku, or Japanese isolationist policies. Golovnin and his crew were held prisoner for two years and were released in 1813. This event, known as the Golovnin Incident, demonstrated that the border between Russia and Japan was too vague for the Russian Empire, and that to avoid another episode such as Golovnin's, the border needed to be clearly defined.

=== Treaty of Shimoda ===
The Treaty of Shimoda of 1855 had defined the border between Japan and Russia to be the strait between Iturup (Etorofu) and Urup (Uruppu) islands in the Kurile chain, but had left the status of Sakhalin (Karafuto) open. Without well-defined borders, incidents between Russian and Japanese settlers began to occur. In order to remedy this situation, the Japanese government sent an ambassador, Enomoto Takeaki, to Saint Petersburg to clearly define the border in this area. After a year of negotiations, Japan agreed to renounce its claims to Sakhalin, with compensation for Japanese residents, access by the fishing fleet to the Sea of Okhotsk, ten-years free use of Russian ports in the area and ownership of all of the Kuril Islands. The Japanese Ministry of Foreign Affairs still cites this treaty as the justification for treating the Kuril Islands as its the northernmost territory.

=== Russo-Japanese Provisional Treaty of Karafuto Island ===
A precursor to the Saint Petersburg Treaty was the Provisional Treaty of Karafuto Island, following another incident where a Japanese official was arrested near Kusunai (now Ilyinskoye). This provisional treaty was signed on March 30, 1867, but had no effect as both sides could not agree on the stipulating terms.

== Effects Post-1875 ==
=== Treaty of Portsmouth ===
The Treaty of Portsmouth ended the Russo-Japanese War on September 5, 1905. Its terms stipulated that Russia cede the southern half of Sakhalin to Japan at fifty degrees North latitude. This treaty changed the border between Russian and Japanese territories, affirming the Japanese presence in Southern Manchuria and Korea.

=== Treaty of San Francisco ===
The San Francisco Peace Treaty, signed on September 8, 1951, effectively ended the war between the Allies of World War II and Japan. This treaty was signed by 48 allied countries, excluding the Soviet Union. Article 2 Section C of the treaty stated that "Japan renounces all right, title and claim to the Kurile Islands, and to that portion of Sakhalin and the islands adjacent to it over which Japan acquired sovereignty as a consequence of the Treaty of Portsmouth of September 5, 1905." This did not, however, give the Kuril Islands to the Soviet Union. The Soviet Union refused to sign the Treaty of San Francisco for these reasons, with Foreign Minister Andrei Gromyko stating the Soviet claim to the Kuril[e] islands and Sakhalin as being "indisputable."

=== Soviet-Japanese Joint Declaration (1956) ===
Since the Soviet Union did not sign the Treaty of San Francisco, the war between Japan and the Soviet Union was not officially ended until the Soviet–Japanese Joint Declaration of 1956. This declaration did not end the dispute over Sakhalin and the Kuril Islands, as it set precedence for a peace treaty to be created in the future that would solve the issue of the Kuril Islands. The declaration stated that the Soviet Union would cede Shikotan Island and the Habomai Islands after the peace treaty was signed, but such a treaty never happened.

== See also ==
- Kuril Islands dispute
- Treaty of San Francisco
