= Soviet assault on Toro =

Military action

- Part of the Invasion of South Sakhalin in the Soviet–Japanese War of World War II
- Map of the invasion of South Sakhalin, with Toro in the left center
Date	15–18 August 1945
Location	Toro, Karafuto Prefecture, Sakhalin Island
Result	Soviet victory

Belligerents
Soviet Union	Japan

Commanders and leaders
(Soviet Union) V. A. Andreyev	(Empire of Japan) Toichiro Mineki

Strength
Over 1,400 men	Initially about 200 men

Casualties and losses
12 killed	About 100 killed About 150 other casualties

The Soviet assault on Toro (Toro Landing, Russian: Десант в порт Торо) was a Soviet attack on the port of Toro (now Shakhtyorsk), in Japan's Karafuto Prefecture on southern Sakhalin during the South Sakhalin Offensive of the Soviet–Japanese War at the end of World War II in August 1945. The forces of the Northern Pacific Flotilla of the Soviet Navy's Pacific Fleet carried out the operation between 15 and 18 August 1945. It was the first amphibious assault on South Sakhalin, preceding the Soviet assault on Maoka (now Kholmsk) that took place from 19 to 22 August 1945.

== Operational plan and opening moves ==
The southern part of Sakhalin Island had belonged to Japan since 1905, constituting Japan's Karafuto Prefecture. Units of the 56th Rifle Corps of the Soviet Red Army's 16th Army (commanded by Lieutenant General Leonty Cheremisov) of the 2nd Far Eastern Front (commanded by Army General Maksim Purkayev) began the South Sakhalin Offensive Operation on 11 August 1945. However, in the Koton Fortified Region on the border between Karafuto and the Soviet portion of the island, the Japanese 88th Division (commanded by Lieutenant General Toichiro Mineki), a component of the Fifth Area Army (commanded by Lieutenant General Kiichiro Higuchi, offered stubborn resistance. On 14 August 1945, the commander-in-chief of Soviet forces in the Far East, Marshal of the Soviet Union Aleksandr Vasilevsky, ordered the commander-in-chief of the Soviet Navy's Pacific Fleet, Admiral Ivan Yumashev, to conduct a series of amphibious landings at ports on the western coast of Sakhalin, deep in the rear of the defending Japanese forces, to expedite the Soviet occupation of Karafuto and prevent the evacuation of Japanese troops from Sakhalin to the Japanese Home Islands. Yumashev ordered the fleet's Northern Pacific Flotilla to conduct the landings.

The Soviets planned their first landing for the port of Toro (now Shakhtyorsk), which lay closest to the battle area in the Koton Fortified Region. Lacking information about the situation in Toro, the commander of the Northern Pacific Flotilla decided to first land a reconnaissance group at the port, and then the main landing force, which consisted of the 365th Battalion, a component of the Soviet Naval Infantry's 113th Rifle Brigade. The Uragan-class guard ship Zarnitsa, the transport Petropavlovsk, a minelayer, two Bolshoi Okhotnik boats, four Maliy Okhotnik boats, four minesweepers, and 21 torpedo boats were allocated to the landing. The ships were organized into four detachments. As commander of the Northern Pacific Flotilla, Vice Admiral Vladimir Andreyev had overall command of the operation. Captain 1st Rank I. S. Leonov, chief of the Underwater Navigation Department of the Pacific Fleet Headquarters, commanded the naval forces, and Lieutenant Colonel K. P. Tavkhutdinov commanded the naval infantry forces.

In preparation for the operation, the Northern Pacific Flotilla's aviation component of 80 aircraft carried out a series of bombing raids on the port of Toro and a significant number of reconnaissance sorties over the port and its approaches. On 15 August 1945, a reconnaissance group landed from the submarine Shch-118 in the Toro area.

The landing force embarked at the Northern Pacific Flotilla's main base, Sovetskaya Gavan. The first detachment of ships (consisting of one patrol vessel and four border patrol boats from the 62nd Naval Border Detachment with a battalion of naval infantrymen on board — a total of 140 men) put to sea at 21:30 on 15 August 1945. During the predawn hours of 16 August, seven Northern Pacific Flotilla Beriev MBR-2 flying boats bombed the port of Toro.

== The landing ==
=== 16 August ===
At 05:00 on 16 August 1945, the Soviet landing force approached Toro undetected, unexpectedly breaking into the port and landing troops on the pier and a sandbank. Caught by surprise, the Japanese offered very weak resistance: only a company of reservists (about 100 men) and a local militia formation (less than 100 men, half of whom did not have firearms) were stationed in the port and the city. By 06:00, the Soviets had occupied the port.

At 09:00, the second echelon of the Soviet landing force, the main force of the naval infantry battalion, a total of 334 men, landed in the port of Toro from 16 torpedo boats. By 10:00, the battle for the village of Toro was over, with the Soviets seizing the town and Japanese losses amounting to 84 killed and 29 captured.

By 19:00, the third echelon of the Soviet landing force, units of the 113th Rifle Brigade totaling 900 men, had completed its landing. The landing force expanded the beachhead it had secured and throughout the day captured several villages around Toro. As Japanese units advanced toward Toro, Japanese resistance increased further. Soviet Naval Aviation carried out 51 combat sorties in support of the landing force, losing one Yakovlev Yak-9 fighter to Japanese anti-aircraft fire.

=== 17 August ===
The Soviet landing force, supported by air power, launched an offensive southward toward the town and port of Esutora (now Uglegorsk) on 17 August. At 09:30, a detachment of three flotilla boats entered the port of Esutora and landed a force of 90 men which quickly occupied the port. During the landing and while supporting Soviet troops in the battle for Esutora, two Soviet torpedo boats were damaged when they struck underwater rocks; they were towed back to Sovetskaya Gavan. Soon, units attacking from the north captured the village of Esutora. The Japanese stubbornly defended the next town, Yama-Sigai (administratively a part of Esutora for the Japanese but considered a separate city by the Soviet command; it is now a district of Uglegorsk). With up to two companies, the Japanese managed to hold back the initial Soviet assault on the fortified heights around the town.

On the afternoon of 17 August, the transport Petropavlovsk arrived at Toro, accompanied by two Bolshoi Okhotnik boats and one minesweeper. They delivered the last battalion of the 113th Rifle Brigade, artillery, and logistics units of the 365th Naval Infantry Battalion. To prevent the Japanese at Yama-Sigai from halting the Soviet advance, the Soviet landing commander decided on a night assault on the town with a naval infantry battalion and a rifle battalion. Fierce fighting continued almost all night.

=== 18 August ===
Supported by naval gunfire, the Soviets cleared Yama-Sigai of Japanese forces by 09:30 on 18 August, and the remnants of the Japanese garrison retreated in disarray into the hills. The Japanese lost 136 men killed and wounded in the battle for Yama-Sigai.

Throughout 18 August, Soviet forces defended their greatly expanded beachhead. Soviet Naval Aviation carried out 37 combat sorties to support them, with one strike at Yama-Sigai mistakenly hitting Soviet positions, killing one Soviet officer. The Soviets decided that continuing the landing force's advance was impractical due to long distances, a lack of large Japanese forces, and the absence of important targets. Instead, they decided to conduct new landings at ports farther south in Sakhalin. This decision resulted in a new landing at Maoka (now Kholmsk) that began on 19 August.

== Results ==
Within two days, the Northern Pacific Flotilla's forces had established a vital foothold on the western coast of Karafuto Prefecture, cutting off Japanese communications along the coast. The main Japanese force on Sakhalin, which was engaged in heavy fighting with advancing Soviet forces near the border between Karafuto and the Soviet portion of the island, was left at risk of complete encirclement. This prompted the Japanese to abandon the further defense of the Koton Fortified Area: On 18 August, the commander of the Japanese forces in the fortified area began surrender negotiations, and he surrendered on 19 August. The Soviet command, in turn, used its foothold at Toro to exploit its success and quickly launch new landings in the major Japanese ports of Maoka and Otomari (now Korsakov) farther south in Karafuto. The landing force's losses during the three days of battle amounted to 12 killed and some wounded.

During the landing operation and in support of the subsequent advance of the troops from the beachhead, Soviet Naval Aviation carried out 174 combat sorties over three days, including 15 sorties by Beriev MBR-2 flying boats, 35 by Ilyushin Il-2 attack aircraft, 116 by fighters, and eight by Petlyakov Pe-2 reconnaissance aircraft. Soviet aircrews claimed the destruction of a barge (which the Japanese identified as a dredger), 66 vehicles, 16 firing positions, two field guns, and an ammunition depot and to have inflicted over 100 casualties on the Japanese. Soviet aircraft also destroyed a significant number of civilian and industrial facilities and residential buildings. There is evidence of Soviet airstrikes on refugee columns, which Soviet pilots may have mistaken for retreating Japanese troop columns.
