= Japanese evacuation of Karafuto and the Kuril Islands =

Evacuation of Japanese residents in the aftermath of World War II

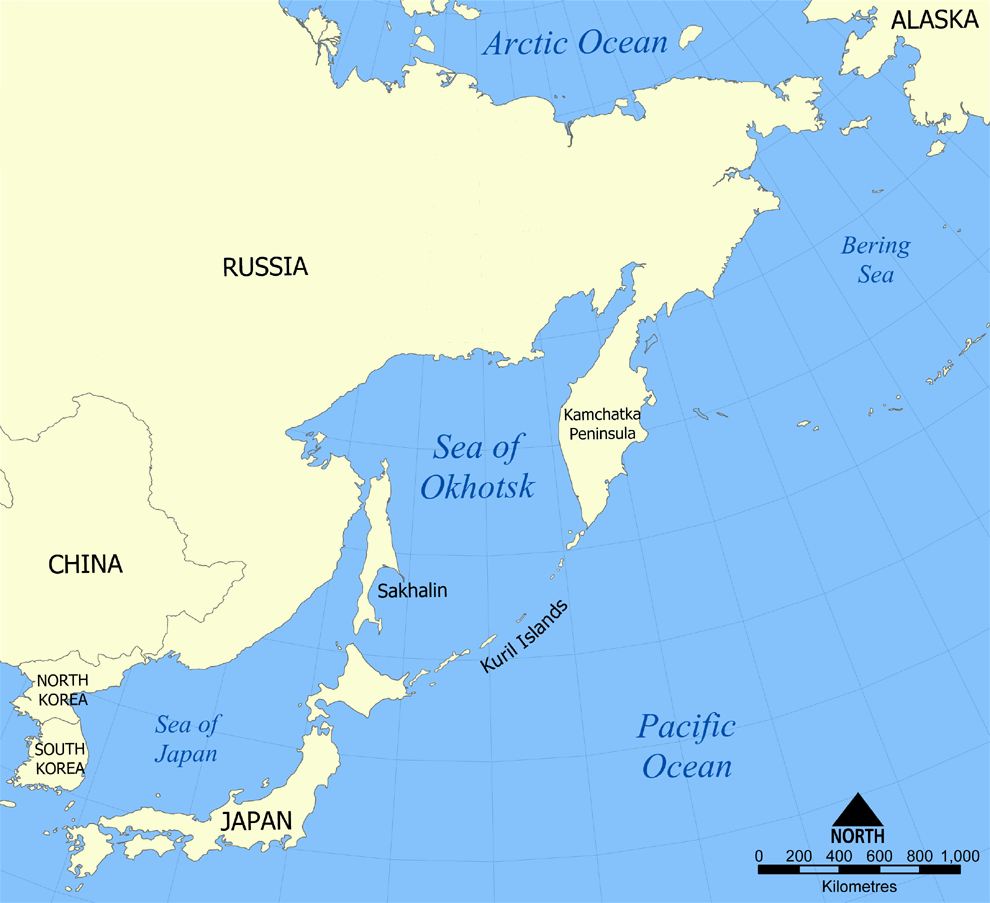
Location of Kuril Islands in the Western Pacific.

Japan evacuated its civilian population and military forces from Karafuto (Sakhalin) and the Chishima (Kuril) islands, to the northwest of the Japanese main islands, in the final months of the Pacific theater of World War II.

== Timeline ==
=== Karafuto ===
The operation began with the crossing of the Horonai (Poronai) Japanese frontier river post and bombardment of the Handenzawa Japanese land frontier post in Shikuka district, as well as the advance to the north of Koton (now Pobedino), a powerful fortified district (FD). Severe fighting with heavy losses on both sides continued for over a week, with Soviet troops breaking the Japanese defenses on 18 August. The Soviets also landed their naval forces deep behind enemy frontlines to aid their ground forces.

According to some of the 6,000 refugees already evacuated from the area, Soviet forces carried out fierce naval bombardment and artillery strikes against civilians awaiting evacuation as well as Japanese installations in Maoka, Shikuka on 10 August. Nearly 1,000 civilians were killed by machine-gun fire in this attack. Telephone operators in the city decided not to evacuate, instead maintaining contact with Wakkanai and Mainland Japan until the moment that Soviet forces destroyed the telephone and postal installations in the city.

On 20 August, after Japan's surrender, fearing that they would be raped by the invading Soviet troops, nine of the twelve female operators poisoned themselves. Three were saved by male colleagues' intervention. The survivors at the post office were treated well by the Soviets.

On 16 August, the coastguard Zarnitsa, four minesweepers, two transports, six gunboats and nineteen torpedo boats landed in Port Toro (now Shakhtersk) with the 365th Separate Marine Battalion and one battalion of the 113th Infantry Brigade. The troops instantly engaged the Japanese in fierce battle and by morning of the next day had captured four populated areas and the port city of Esutoru (now Uglegorsk), Anbetsu (now Vozvrashcheniye) and Yerinai).

During the Soviet assault on Maoka, on 20 August, a combined marine battalion and the 113th Infantry Brigade landed in Port Maoka (now Kholmsk). They were preceded by a group of scouts, landed secretly by a submarine, in the Maoka area to successfully complete their task. However, Japanese resistance was desperate, and the landing party had to fight particularly fiercely. Japanese fire set one of the coastguard vessels on fire, to which the Soviet response was intense naval bombardment of the city, causing more civilian deaths.

The rest of the Japanese Maoka defenders retreated by Tei (now Polyakovo) and Futomato (now Chaplanovo) in Ikenohata county, between the mountains in the direction of Toyohara in order to make a last stand in the capital of the province or in Kawakami Sumiyama county for sustained guerrilla resistance.

On 25 August, another 1,600 men landed in Otomari (now Korsakov). The Japanese garrison of 3,400 men laid down their arms with almost no resistance and surrendered.

Some vessels of the last convoy, including civilian evacuees, had been sunk by Soviet submarines in the Aniva Gulf. Soviet Leninets-class submarine L-12 and L-19 sank two Japanese refugee transport ships Ogasawara Maru and Taito Maru also damaged No.2 Shinko Maru on 22 August. Over 2,400 civilians were killed.

=== Kurils ===
The rout of Japanese forces in Manchuria and Sakhalin created favorable conditions for invasion of the Kuril Islands. The key Japanese position was on Shumushu and Paramushiro Islands. On 18 August, two coast guard ships, the mine layer Okhotsk, four minesweepers, 17 transports and 16 special landing vessels with nearly 9,000 sailors, soldiers, and officers on board, approached Shumushu and Paramushiro to start the landing operation. The Japanese offered fierce resistance. Bloody battles took place in Shumushu and Paramushiro with varying success till 23 August when the Japanese garrison surrendered.

By the end of August, all the northern Kurils were under the control of Soviet forces, including Uruppu Island. The Northern Pacific Flotilla occupied the rest of the islands to the south of Uruppu. Up to 60,000 Japanese officers and men were taken prisoner in the Kurils. The landing operation in the Kurils was the last of World War II.

In the Kurils a similar pattern was repeated when Japanese civilians fled from Shumushu and Paramushiro before the Soviet invasion (the Russians only sank one war vessel transporting some Japanese troops), but did not occur at the time in some islands such as Uruppu and South Kurils. In these cases, Russian troops arrived in aggressive form to expel local citizens and confiscate local property.

== See also ==
- Battle of the Kuril Islands
- Evacuation of Manchukuo
- Evacuation of East Prussia
- Evacuation of Finnish Karelia
- Japanese repatriation from Huludao
- Soviet assault on Maoka
- Soviet Invasion of South Sakhalin
- World War II evacuation and expulsion
