= Vladimir Andreyev (admiral) =

Soviet naval officer (1904–1994)

Vladimir Aleksandrovich Andreyev
- Born: 26 December [O.S. 13 December] 1904; Bugat station, Chinese Eastern Railway
- Died: 28 March 1994 (aged 89); Moscow, Russia
- Burial place: Kuntsevo Cemetery
- Military career
- Allegiance: USSR
- Branch: Soviet Navy
- Service years: 1923-1968
- Rank: Admiral
- Conflicts: Battle of Lake Khasan; Second World War; Soviet–Japanese War
- Awards: Order of Lenin; Order of the Red Banner (three times); Order of Nakhimov First Class; Order of Ushakov First Class; Order of the Patriotic War First Class; Order of the Red Star; Legion of Merit

Vladimir Aleksandrovich Andreyev (Russian: Владимир Александрович Андреев; 26 December [O.S. 13 December] 1904 – 28 March 1994) was an officer of the Soviet Navy. He served during the Second World War and reached the rank of admiral.

Andreyev joined the navy after studying at the M. V. Frunze Naval School, initially serving in the Baltic Fleet. Noticed for his abilities, he was appointed assistant to fleet commander Mikhail Viktorov, before joining the battleship Marat as a junior navigator. He was dispatched to the Pacific to serve in the newly consistituted Pacific Fleet, where he rose to be commander of minesweeping brigade. In 1938, he took part in the Battle of Lake Khasan, and after studies at the command faculty of the Voroshilov Naval Academy, was assigned to the Black Sea Fleet. From May 1941 until 1943, Andreyev was chief of staff of the Black Sea Fleet. With the Axis invasion of the Soviet Union in June 1941, he took an active role in developing defensive plans for minelaying, carrying out raids and troop landings, and fire support operations in the defence of Odessa and of Sevastopol.

In April 1943, Andreyev was assigned to the Pacific as commander of the Northern Pacific Flotilla. He saw action in the Soviet–Japanese War, during the operations to capture South Sakhalin. The operation ended with South Sakhalin fully in Soviet hands. For his part in this success, Andreyev was awarded the Order of Ushakov, 1st class. Andreyev remained in command of the Northern Pacific Flotilla until November 1945, when he was appointed commander of the Pacific Fleet's Sakhalin Military Flotilla. He held this post until June 1946, when he was transferred to become chief of staff of the Baltic Fleet, and then from March 1947, commander of the 4th Navy. Between May 1953 and March 1955 he was Deputy Chief of the Main Staff of the Navy, and then Admiral-Inspector of the Main Inspectorate of the Ministry of Defence. He held this position until January 1957, with a brief stint as acting commander of the Black Sea Fleet between November and December 1955. He served as head of the Kuznetsov Naval Academy between January 1957 and January 1961, and from November 1960 to April 1967, was Chief of Naval Logistics. He was then for a time at the disposal of the Commander-in-Chief of the Navy, retiring in March 1968.

In retirement Andreyev wrote a number of books about the war, and published his memoirs, Seas and Years, in 1982. He died in 1994, at the age of 89.

== Early years and education ==
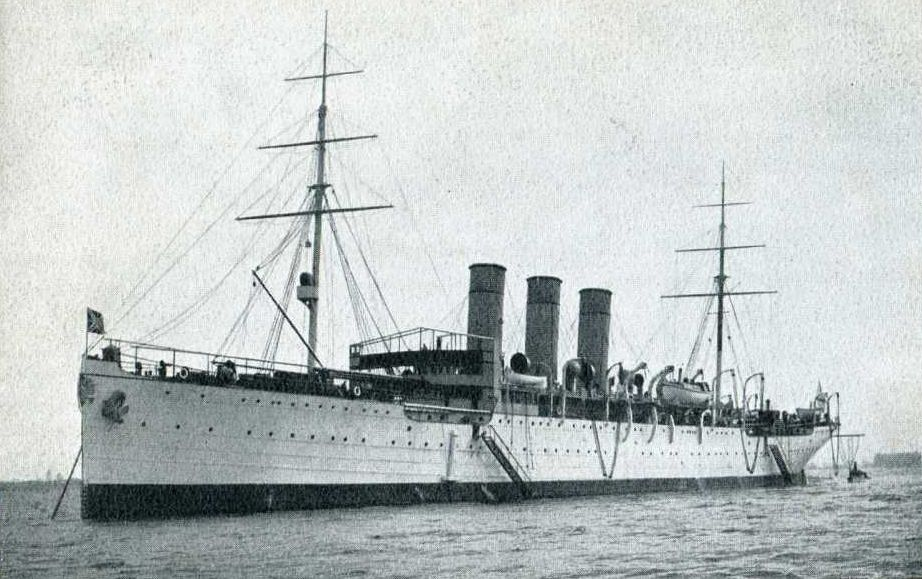
The training ship Okean. Andreyev took part in a training voyage aboard her in 1925.

Andreyev was born on 26 December [O.S. 13 December] 1904 at the Bugyat railway station on the Chinese Eastern Railway. By the early 1920s he was a member of the Komsomol and living in Moscow, when the campaign to "Strengthen the Red Fleet" was announced. Andreyev and a friend applied to the Komsomol's Khamovnichesky District Committee and were given the last two vouchers to the Naval Preparatory School. He entered the Naval Preparatory School in January 1923, and graduated in September 1924. The following month he enrolled in the M. V. Frunze Naval School, joined the All-Union Communist Party (Bolsheviks) in 1925, and graduated in October 1927. During his studies, Andreyev took part in foreign voyages aboard the training ships Aurora in 1924, and Okean in 1925. On graduating from the naval school in October, Andreyev was assigned to the Baltic Fleet to serve as a platoon commander. He caught the attention of the fleet command, and was requested to serve as flag officer to Mikhail Viktorov, the fleet commander. Andreyev at first tried to refuse, but was appointed in January 1928. Serving under Viktorov, Andreyev gained experience, and in October 1929, enrolled in the navigation class of the Special Courses for the Naval Command Staff. He graduated in September 1930, and in October 1930, was assigned to the battleship Marat as a junior navigator.

Andreyev remained aboard the Marat until December 1932, when he was dispatched to the Pacific to serve in the newly consistituted Pacific Fleet. He arrived in April 1932, and from May 1932 to January 1934, served as flag navigator of the minelaying and minesweeping brigade. Then he was appointed commander of the minelayer Erivan, followed by the minelayer Teodor Nette. He was succeeded as flag navigator by Sergey Gorshkov. From December 1936 to January 1938, Andreyev was chief of staff of the minesweeping brigade, and then commanded the brigade until August 1939. In 1938, he took part in the Battle of Lake Khasan, and from August 1939 to April 1940, he commanded the maritime protection area of the Pacific Fleet's main base. From April 1940 to April 1941, Andreyev studied at the command faculty of the Voroshilov Naval Academy, and was then assigned to the Black Sea Fleet.

== Second World War ==
=== Black Sea ===
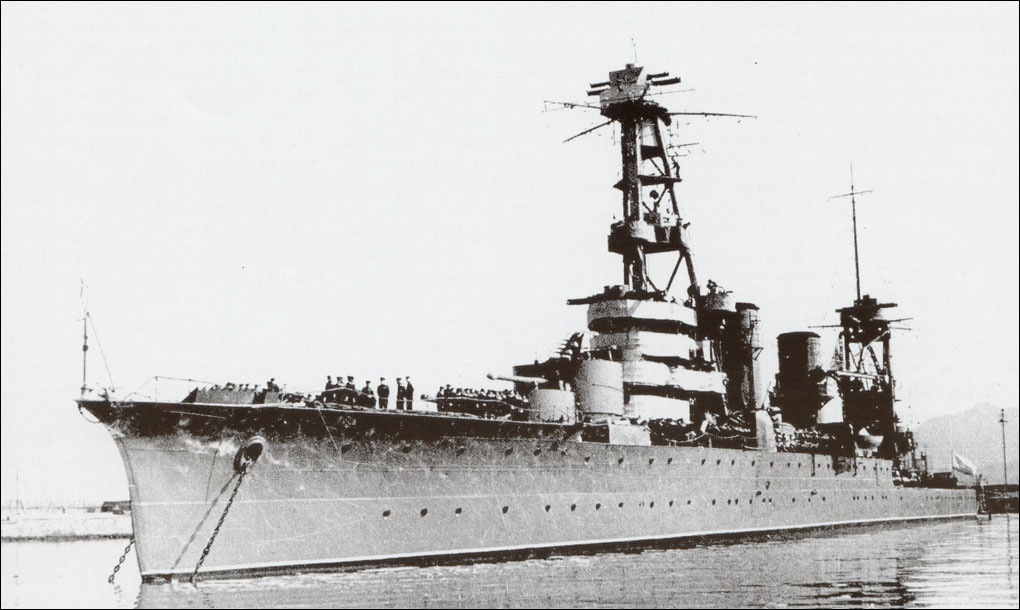
The cruiser Krasny Kavkaz. Andreyev oversaw landing and evacuation operations aboard her during the early months of the Axis invasion.

From May 1941 until 1943, Andreyev was chief of staff of the Black Sea Fleet. With the Axis invasion of the Soviet Union in June 1941, he took an active role in developing defensive plans for minelaying, the Raid on Constanța on 26 June 1941, and the defence of Odessa. Troops were landed near Grigoryevka and others were evacuated from Odessa on the night of 22 September 1941. During the landing of troops near Grigoryevka, Andreyev was with the headquarters on board the cruiser Krasny Kavkaz. When the destroyer Frunze, flagship of the squadron commander Lev Vladimirsky, was sunk by German aircraft, command temporarily devolved to the landing detachment commander, Captain 1st Rank Sergey Gorshkov. Andreyev recommended that Gorshkov use naval craft for the landing, after the landing detachment was delayed. The landing was successful, and supported by troops from Odessa, Soviet forces captured a bridgehead near Grigoryevka and forced enemy artillery away from the city.

By October 1941, Sevastopol was under air attack, and on 30 October some of the large ships were withdrawn, leaving the cruisers Chervona Ukraina and Krasny Krym, the destroyers Bodry, Nezamozhnik, and Shaumyan, and other vessels undergoing repairs. Andreyev led an artillery support detachment to help defend the city, which included the cruiser Krasny Kavkaz, and the destroyers Dzerzhinsky and Zheleznyakov, with support from other ships that arrived at the base. When the Axis assault on Sevastopol began on 17 December, Andreyev supervised the transfer of the 79th Naval Rifle Brigade to the Kerch Peninsula, aboard the cruisers Krasny Kavkaz, Krasny Krym, the destroyer leader Kharkov, and the destroyers Bodry and Nezamozhnik. Despite storm, fog and minefields, the squadron under Filipp Oktyabrsky reached their destination without loss, temporarily frustrating the assault on the city. In the Kerch-Feodosia landing operation in December 1941, Andreyev commanded a detachment of artillery support ships, overseeing the landing of a detachment of toops under Captain 1st Rank Nikolai Basistiy, and providing them with fire support. Despite difficulties in mooring the ships at the landing site on 29 December, the landing was a success, and the ships returned to Novorossiysk on 1 January 1942. Throughout January and February 1942, Andreyev oversaw numerous troop landings and fire support operations on the Crimean peninsula.

=== Pacific ===
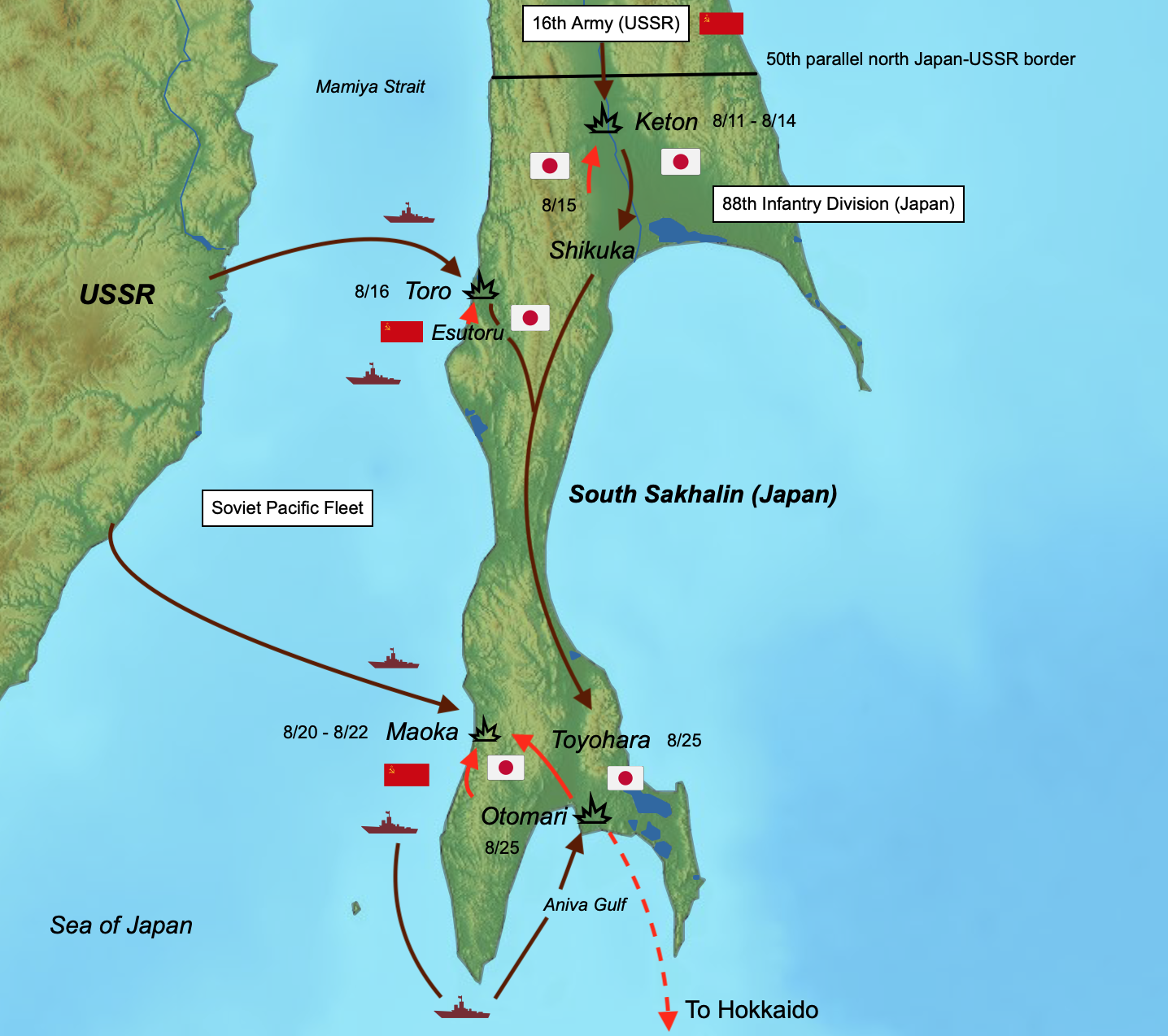
Map of operations for the Soviet invasion of South Sakhalin, showing the movements of Andreyev's Northern Pacific Flotilla

In February 1943, Andreyev was appointed deputy head of the operational department of the Naval General Staff, but in April 1943 he was assigned to the Pacific as commander of the Northern Pacific Flotilla. He was promoted to rear-admiral on 18 April 1943, and to vice-admiral on 5 November 1944. With the commencement of the Soviet–Japanese War in 1945, Soviet commanders drew up plans to capture South Sakhalin. Andreyev and his flotilla was assigned to support the 56th Rifle Corps of the 2nd Far Eastern Front's 16th Army in a complex operation to secure the island. On 8 August the flotilla secretly laid minefields in the Tatar Strait and Sakhalin Bay. On 10 August, the flotilla was ordered to land troops in South Sakhalin. The port of Esutoru was initially selected, but was then deemed too shallow to unload equipment. The port of Tōro was instead chosen on 14 August, with Andreyev working to land the 365th Marine Battalion, and an accompanying rifle battalion, with support from aviation and naval gunfire. The landings were carried out on the night of 16 August, with the successful capture of the port and surrounding areas, though Andreyev was reprimanded by the front commander for using a rifle battalion without permission and had to return it. Andreyev was next ordered on 15 August to capture the port of Maoka, beginning the assault on the morning of 20 August with five transports and seventeen ships carrying the 113th Rifle Brigade and a battalion of sailors. Despite resistance, the Soviet assault on Maoka was a success, and Andreyev flew to Maoka by seaplane to assume command of the operation. From Maoka, Andreyev and the flotilla sailed to Otomari, arriving on 25 August, when the garrison surrendered. This marked the end of the operation, with South Sakhalin now fully in Soviet hands. From there Andreyev and the flotilla went on to accept the surrender of Japanese troops on the South Kuril Islands of Iturup, Kunashir, Shikotan, and others. The islands of the Lesser Kuril Chain were occupied without resistance between 2 and 5 September, and the Kuril Islands were ultimately all occupied. For his part in this success, Andreyev was awarded the Order of Ushakov, 1st class.

== Post-war service ==
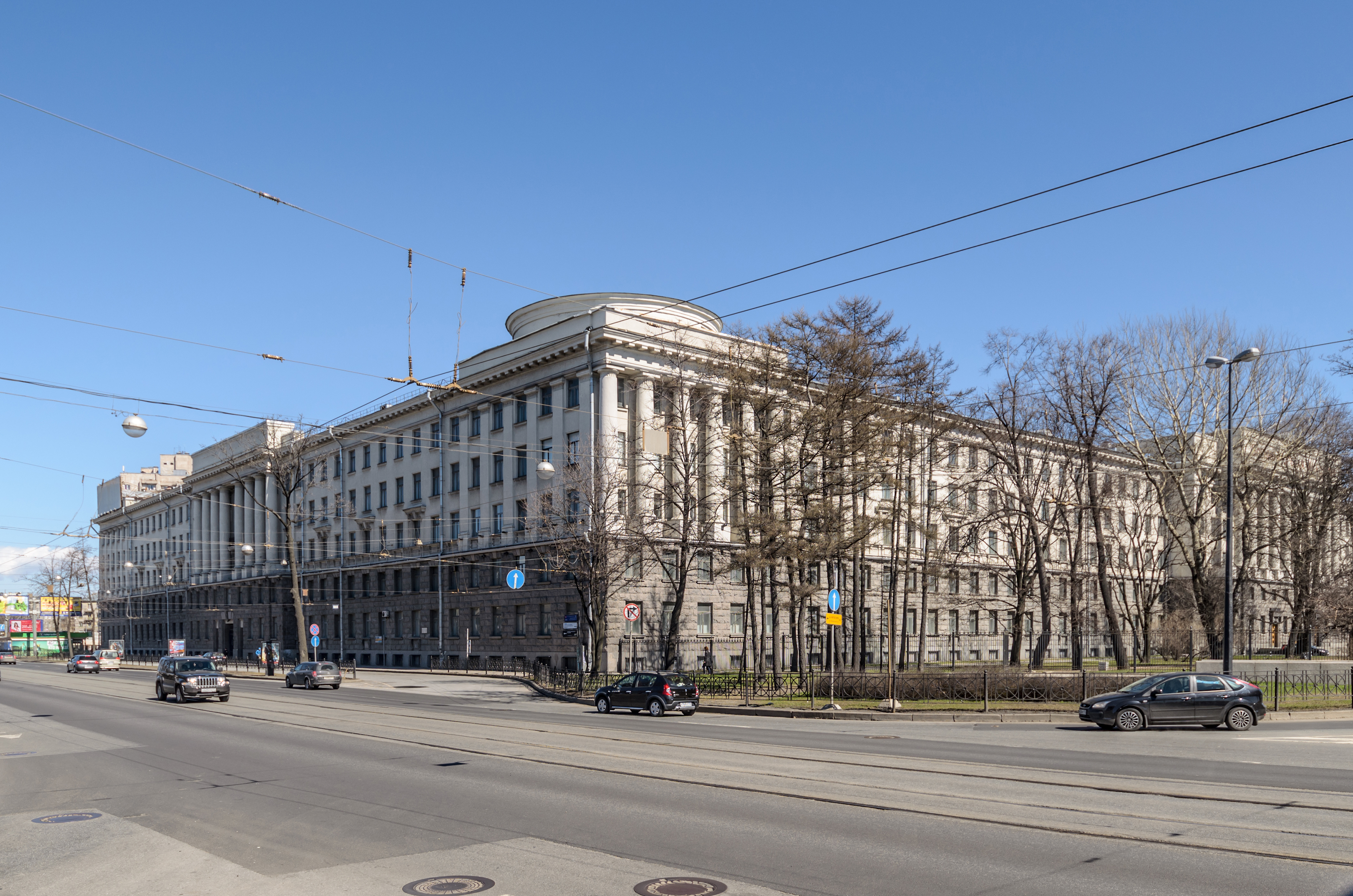
The Kuznetsov Naval Academy. Andreyev served as head of the academy between 1957 and 1961.

Andreyev remained in command of the Northern Pacific Flotilla until November 1945, when he was appointed commander of the Pacific Fleet's Sakhalin Military Flotilla. He held this post until June 1946, when he was transferred to become chief of staff of the Baltic Fleet, and then from March 1947, commander of the 4th Navy, one of the two fleet commands that the Baltic Fleet was for a time split into. He was promoted to admiral on 27 January 1951, and in August 1952 became First Deputy Chief of the Naval General Staff and the Main Staff of the Navy. Between May 1953 and March 1955 he was Deputy Chief of the Main Staff of the Navy, and then Admiral-Inspector of the Main Inspectorate of the Ministry of Defence. He held this position until January 1957, with a brief stint as acting commander of the Black Sea Fleet between November and December 1955. He served as head of the Voroshilov Naval Academy between January 1957 and January 1961, and from November 1960 to April 1967, was Chief of Naval Logistics. He was then for a time at the disposal of the Commander-in-Chief of the Navy, retiring in March 1968.

In retirement Andreyev wrote a number of books about the war, and published his memoirs, Seas and Years, in 1982. He died in Moscow on 27 January 1994, at the age of 89. He was cremated and his ashes placed in the columbarium of the Kuntsevo Cemetery.

== Honours and awards ==
Over his career Andreyev received the Order of Lenin in 1948, the Order of the Red Banner three times, in 1942, 1944, and 1953, the Orders of Nakhimov in 1944 Ushakov in 1945, and the Patriotic War in the first classes, the Order of the Red Star in 1984, and various other medals. He also received the American Legion of Merit. In 2019, the Vladimir Andreyev, a modified Ivan Gren-class landing ship built for the Russian Navy, was laid down.
