= 2nd Front =

2nd Front may refer to major formations of the Soviet Army during World War II:

- 2nd Baltic Front
- 2nd Belorussian Front
- 2nd Far Eastern Front
- 2nd Ukrainian Front
