= Soviet invasion of South Sakhalin =

1945 Soviet invasion of the Japanese portion of Sakhalin Island

- Part of the Soviet–Japanese War
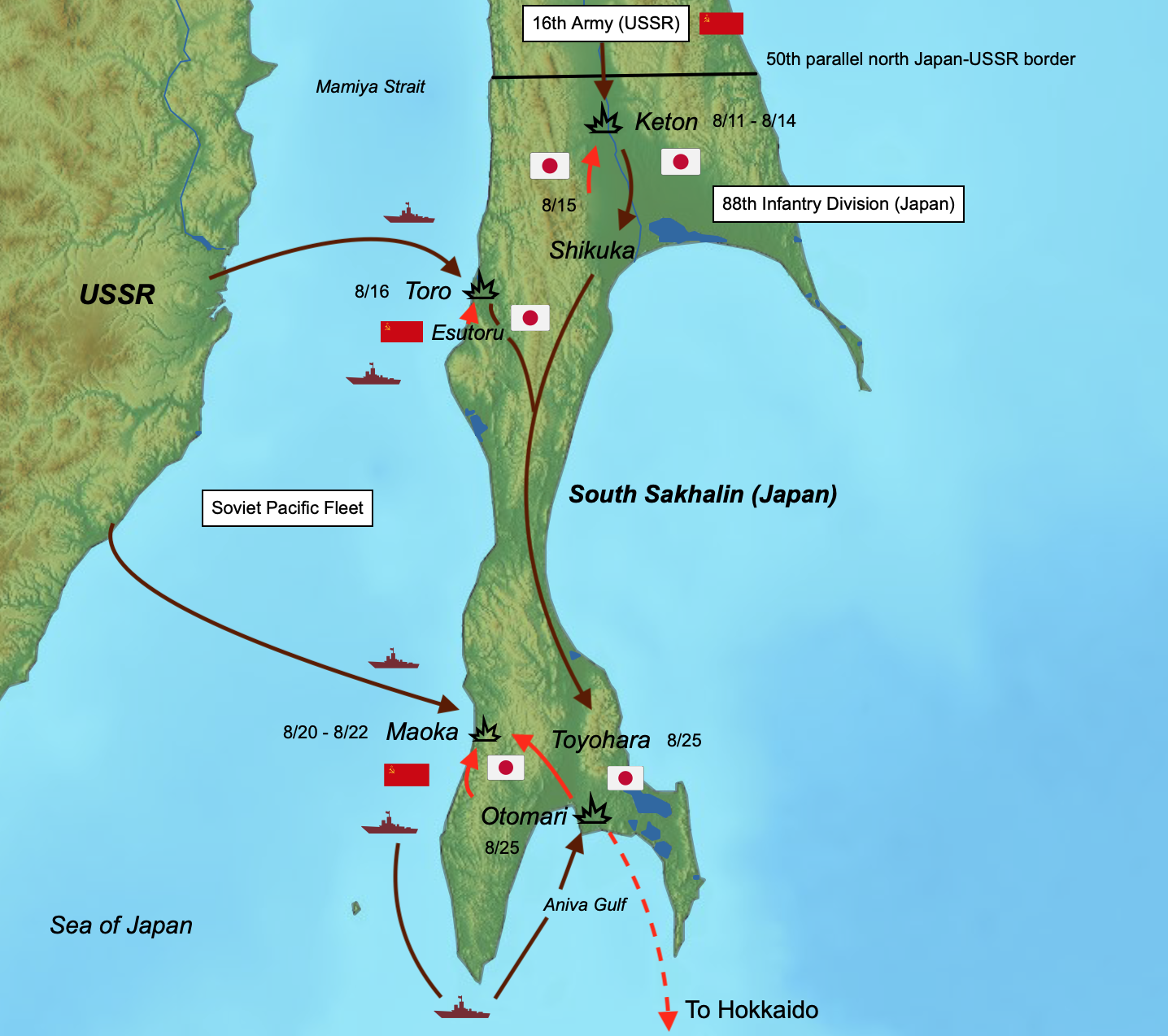
- Map of the Invasion of South Sakhalin
Date	11–25 August 1945 (2 weeks)
Location	Karafuto Prefecture, Japan (now Sakhalin Oblast, Russia)
Result	Soviet victory
Territorial changes	Karafuto Prefecture is annexed by the Soviet Union and incorporated into Sakhalin Oblast.

Belligerents
Soviet Union	Japan

Commanders and leaders
Maksim Purkayev; Leonty Cheremisov; Anatoly Petrakovsky; Ivan Baturov	Kiichiro Higuchi; Saburo Hagi; Junichiro Mineki

Units involved
16th Army; Pacific Fleet	Fifth Area Army

Strength
100,000 men	19,000 men (excluding 10,000 reservists)

Casualties and losses
56th Rifle Corps: 527+ killed 845+ wounded Pacific Fleet: 89+ killed Total killed: 616–1,191+ killed	Northern Army: 700–2,000 killed 18,202 captured
- 3,500–3,700 Japanese civilian casualties

The Soviet Union invaded the Japanese portion of Sakhalin Island, also known as Karafuto Prefecture. The invasion was part of the Soviet–Japanese War, a minor campaign in the Asian theatre during World War II.

== Background ==
Following the Japanese invasion of Sakhalin in 1905, control of the island was split according to the Treaty of Portsmouth, with the Russian Empire controlling the northern half and the Empire of Japan controlling the portion south of the 50th parallel north. It was known in Japan as Karafuto Prefecture and the Northern District.

During the Yalta Conference in 1945, Soviet Premier Joseph Stalin pledged to enter the fight against the Empire of Japan "two or three months after Germany has surrendered and the war in Europe is terminated." That would create another strategic front against Japan, which was deemed necessary to end the war. As a result of their participation, the Soviets would be awarded South Sakhalin and the Kuril Islands, among other concessions. The United States would aid the Red Army in Project Hula in preparation for the invasion.

On 5 April, the Soviets formally repudiated the Soviet–Japanese Neutrality Pact.

On 9 August, the Soviets launched a full-scale invasion of Manchuria, which started the Soviet–Japanese War. That war began three days after the United States atomic bombing of Hiroshima, and it included plans to invade South Sakhalin. The main purpose of the invasion was to clear Japanese resistance and to be prepared within 10 to 14 days to invade Hokkaido, the northernmost of Japan's home islands.

== Order of battle ==
=== Soviet Union ===
- 2nd Far Eastern Front (commanded by General of the Army Maksim Purkayev)
  - 16th Army (commanded by General Leonty Cheremisov)
    - 56th Rifle Corps
      - 79th Rifle Division
      - 2nd Rifle Brigade
      - 5th Rifle Brigade
      - 214th Tank Brigade
      - 113th Rifle Brigade
    - 255th Composite Aviation Division (106 aircraft)
- Pacific Fleet (commanded by Admiral Ivan Yumashev)
  - Northern Pacific Flotilla (commanded by Vice-Admiral Vladimir Andreyev)
  - Pacific Fleet naval aircraft (80 aircraft)
  - 365th Naval Infantry Battalion

=== Imperial Japan ===
Army:

- 88th Infantry Division of the Japanese Fifth Area Army (commanded by Lieutenant General Kiichiro Higuchi)
  - Karafuto fortified area of the Border Guard. (17 bunkers, 28 artillery and 18 mortar positions, and other facilities; garrison of 5,400 troops.)
  - Detachments of Reservists

Navy:

- Naval Infantry
  - Northeast Air Fleet Karafuto Region ground defence units
  - some units from Ominato Defence Force
  - part of the Soya Defence Force – the icebreaker Odomari, the special gunboat Chitose Maru, the Soya Defence Guard Station, and the Nishinotoro Defence Guard Station.
  - Toyohara Navy Office – Military Attaché: Rear Admiral Koichi Kuroki

== Invasion ==
South Sakhalin offensive

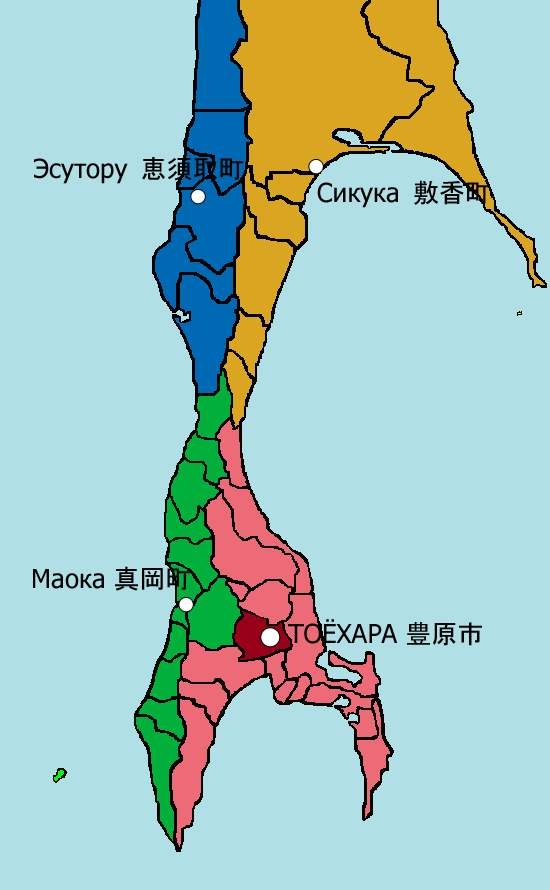
Subprefectures of Karafuto Prefecture

=== General situation ===
Before the outbreak of the Japan-Soviet war, the Japanese military's deployment was divided into the northern area (Shikika and Esutoru districts) and the southern area (Toyohara and Maoka districts). The 125th Infantry Regiment was stationed in the northern area, and the main force of the 88th Division was in the southern area. Both were tasked with conducting defensive operations in a prolonged battle, either against the Soviet Union or the United States. The northern area was covered by tundra, and the transportation network was underdeveloped. From the border to the vicinity of Kamishikika Station, there was essentially one military road and railway, making it easy to predict the enemy's course. The 88th Division, on-site, had been requesting a reorganization to focus more on the Soviet threat since late June. Finally, on August 3, they received permission to intercept in case of a Soviet invasion.

On August 9, the Soviet Union declared war on Japan, but the order for the Soviet 16th Army to invade Sakhalin came on the night of August 10. The operation plan was divided into three phases: In the first phase, the 1st brigade (primarily the 79th Rifle Division and the 214th Tank Brigade) would break through the border security line. In the second phase, they would capture Kotono Station, which was considered a "fortress", and in the third phase, the 2nd brigade (primarily the 2nd Rifle Brigade) would rapidly advance to occupy South Sakhalin. Two brigades from the border area were the main axis, and supplementary amphibious operations were planned at Tōro and Maoka (Holmsk). The delay in the Soviet attack after the war began allowed the Japanese side some flexibility to reorganize forces for the Soviet threat. However, the Soviet forces faced intense resistance during the first phase, and delays in gathering forces for the second phase, the Kotono capture, ensued.

The Japanese 5th Area Army received the news of the Soviet participation early on August 9 but instructed its subordinate units to refrain from active combat actions. This restraint order was lifted the next day, but due to communication delays, the frontline units did not receive the update in time, leading to overly passive tactical actions on the front lines. After the restraint order was lifted, the 5th Area Army instructed the 1st Air Division's 54th Fighter Squadron to advance to Ochiai Airfield, but bad weather prevented the operation. Meanwhile, Soviet aircraft also struggled with the weather but managed to provide ground support. On August 13, the 5th Area Army decided to send reinforcements—three battalions from the 7th Division in Hokkaido—and even planned a counter-invasion of North Sakhalin (scheduled for August 16). However, on August 15, following the acceptance of the Potsdam Declaration, an order was issued from the Imperial General Headquarters to cease active offensives (Order 1382).

The 88th Division on-site initiated a defense mobilization on August 9 and began recruiting special defense forces. On August 10, a combat command post was established at Kamishikika, with several staff members sent. By August 13, the National Volunteer Combat Teams were also summoned. The recruitment of volunteer combat teams from among the general populace was unique to the Sakhalin campaign, with the aim of giving the appearance of military readiness to deter the Soviet advance. The division learned of Japan’s acceptance of the Potsdam Declaration on August 15 via the imperial broadcast.

At 4 pm on August 16, the Imperial General Headquarters issued Order 1382, directing all military forces, including the 5th Area Army in Hokkaido, to cease combat immediately, except for defensive actions in case of an enemy attack before ceasefire negotiations were established. The deadline for this order was within 48 hours. However, on August 16, when the Tōro landing operation began, the 5th Area Army’s Commander, Major General Kiiichiro Higuchi, ordered the 88th Division in South Sakhalin to continue fighting and block the Soviet advance, issuing a command to defend South Sakhalin at all costs. This order was based on the fear that the Soviet forces might concentrate at Ōtomari in South Sakhalin and advance as far as Hokkaido. However, it is unclear what instructions were given by the 5th Area Army as there is no original documentation on the matter. The War History series does support the idea that Division Commander Mineki’s recollections align more closely with the stance of the 5th Area Army, suggesting the order to defend South Sakhalin might not have been explicit.

When Major Yoshio Suzuki, the Chief of Staff of the 88th Division, received Higuchi's combat order on the afternoon of August 16, preparations for ceasefire were already underway, such as the disbandment of mobilized units, the discharge of some troops, and the disposal of the regimental flag. The division had no tanks or aircraft, and certainly no anti-tank or anti-aircraft weapons that could withstand Soviet forces. In light of this, Suzuki quickly ordered the re-arming of units and the occupation of positions. Civilians, at this point, were already voicing complaints, wondering if the military was still going to continue fighting.

On the west coast of northern South Sakhalin, in Esutoru (Esetoru), Soviet soldiers, thinking that there were no Japanese defenders, landed without much aggression. However, they were met with gunfire from Japanese troops, resulting in the deaths of about seven Soviet soldiers. The Soviets retaliated, marking the first combat in Sakhalin after the war ended. On August 14, a large-scale blackout occurred in Esutoru, and the local Japanese forces were unaware of the emperor's broadcast on August 15, with the higher-ups in the division attempting to hide the fact of the war's end.

From the Soviet perspective, the Emperor's announcement of Japan's acceptance of the Potsdam Declaration was viewed as a general surrender. They maintained that Japan was still resisting and that it would only be considered a true surrender when the Emperor commanded the military to cease combat and lay down their arms. Despite this, both sides were willing to engage in ceasefire negotiations. Japan demanded that Soviet forces halt their occupation at the current positions, warning that further advances would be met with resistance. The Soviet Union, adhering to its demand for unconditional surrender, was determined to push forward and continue occupying the territory. The Japanese forces in South Sakhalin did not comply with disarmament or surrender and continued to resist. Even after August 16, Soviet forces continued their military operations to advance. U.S. General Douglas MacArthur intervened, urging the Soviet General Staff to cease attacks (temporarily halt their advance), but the Soviets responded that whether they would cease operations depended on the local commanders, as the Japanese forces had not complied with the advance.

The Soviets had originally planned to invade South Sakhalin and the Kuril Islands after evaluating the progress of the battles in Manchuria. However, since the war situation in Manchuria developed more favorably than expected, the Soviet High Command decided on August 10 to begin a full-scale invasion of Sakhalin. Cherevko (2003) argues that the continuation of combat by Japanese forces in both Manchuria and Sakhalin led the Soviet forces to intensify their attacks. On the other hand, according to Nakayama (2001), the reason the Soviet Union persisted with the invasion of southern Sakhalin was to prevent Japan's retreat from Sakhalin and secure bases for the eventual occupation of northern Hokkaido. On August 18–19, Soviet Far Eastern Commander Marshal Aleksandr Vasilevsky ordered the occupation of Sakhalin and the Kuril Islands by August 25 and the northernmost part of Hokkaido by September 1. In the border area near Gutun, Soviet troops launched a general attack on 16 August, but were unable to overrun the main positions until the 125th Infantry Regiment of the Japanese garrison was disarmed on 19 August following an immediate ceasefire order. Soviet forces also made a tower road landing on 16 August, but the landing force's advance was sluggish. Traffic routes were congested with refugees, and Japanese forces often abandoned attempts to stop enemy forces by destroying bridges and other means. During this period, the Japanese negotiated ceasefires in various locations with halts at their current positions, and Division Commander Mineki himself went to the northern sector to negotiate, but all halts to the advance were refused by the Soviets, often resulting in military attachés being shot dead.

=== Karafuto line ===
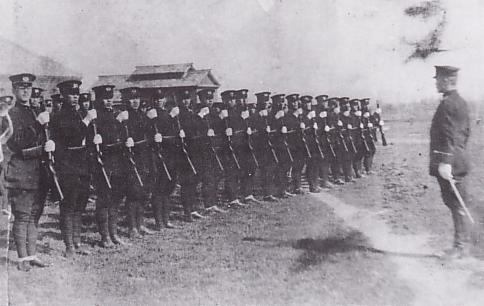
Japanese Border Police: Countering the Soviet Army along with Army forces

The 125th Infantry Regiment, responsible for the defense of the Northern District along the border, had its main forces stationed at Uro and Kamishikika as of August 9, with only the 2nd Battalion stationed at Furuton to prepare for the Soviet army. As soon as the war began, Colonel Kobayashi, the regiment commander, ordered the retreat of border outposts and civilians and the destruction of roads, leading the main forces of the regiment northward. Since the Soviet forces only carried out artillery bombardments without advancing, the regiment was able to set up positions on the western side of Happo Mountain northwest of Furuton by August 10. Civilian evacuation and road destruction work were carried out under the guidance of the division staff who advanced to Kamishikika, with the Special Security Unit and local security units in charge.

The Soviet military’s invasion from the central military road began around 5 a.m. on August 11. The frontline at Handa, defended by about 100 men (two infantry squads and 28 Border Police officers), held off the Soviet advance for an entire day with the support of tanks and aircraft before being nearly completely destroyed on August 12. This death-defying resistance raised the morale of nearby Japanese forces, while the Soviets were shocked to record Handa as a fortress with field fortifications—though in reality, it was a minor defense consisting of a few light covers and anti-tank obstacles utilizing the embankments of the Handa River, and trenches were insufficient due to the wet tundra. Around midday on August 12, Soviet forces from the 179th Rifle Regiment, having broken through the tundra area from the Musuka region, began advancing towards Furuton but were momentarily stopped by a charge from the 2nd Battalion of the 88th Transport Regiment armed with training wooden guns and bayonets. Moreover, the 5th Army's order to cease aggressive attacks, issued on August 9, had reached the 125th Infantry Regiment by this time, restricting its tactics.

On August 13, the Soviet 79th Rifle Division launched a siege attack on the 125th Infantry Regiment, combining the main forces on the military road and the flanking 179th Rifle Regiment. Despite the Japanese army's anti-tank guns, Soviet tanks were not destroyed, and the defenders at the Shishiha positions along the military road suffered heavy losses and were forced to retreat. However, the main force of the Soviet 1st Division, shocked by the fierce resistance, only managed to advance a few hundred meters before transitioning into defensive positions. Fierce fighting continued between the 1st Battalion of the 125th Infantry Regiment and the 179th Rifle Regiment around the barracks in Furuton, but by the evening of August 16, Japanese forces were driven into retreat after the deaths of Major Sadaharu Kobayashi and the battalion's deputy, Lieutenant Colonel Iwakai.

On August 16, the Soviet main force resumed a general attack, deploying artillery pieces like the 213 artillery units and succeeded in opening the military road to Furuton. However, they were unable to capture the key position of Happo Mountain. On August 17 and 18, a ceasefire order reached the 125th Infantry Regiment’s headquarters from the division, but fighting continued. On August 18, Colonel Kobayashi sent a messenger and agreed to surrender. The 125th Infantry Regiment laid down their arms and ended combat at 10 a.m. on August 19.

After the surrender of the 125th Infantry Regiment, the Japanese command in the Northern District was effectively assumed by the staff of the 88th Division stationed at Kamishikika. During the fighting on the central military road, by the morning of August 17, evacuation of the civilian population from Kamishikika had been completed, and the town was burned to the ground by Japanese forces' scorched earth tactics, along with an air raid by 20 Soviet aircraft. Kamishikika was abandoned on August 20, marking the start of a full retreat. The construction of a defensive line involving the destruction of the Uro Bridge and the Chidori River Bridge was considered but ultimately abandoned due to the presence of evacuees. Negotiations between the advancing Japanese divisional commanders and Soviet forces resulted in a ceasefire agreement on August 22.

Additionally, separate from the central military road, Soviet forces launched an invasion on the western coast at Anbetsu, Nishi Saku Tan Village, on August 12. However, the 125th Infantry Regiment’s Anbetsu detachment (one company), supported by civilians, countered the Soviet attack. The Anbetsu detachment, after receiving a ceasefire order from the regiment's headquarters on August 20, refused to surrender and, absorbing personnel from other units, marched southward with about 500 men. Upon reaching the northern part of Nagoyama Town, the detachment disbanded, changed into civilian clothes, and took independent action. Some succeeded in reporting to the 5th Army Headquarters in Hokkaido.

The losses sustained by the Japanese forces in the Northern District amounted to 568 killed, mostly due to the battles around Furuton. The Soviet losses remain unknown, but Japanese estimates suggest 1,000 killed and dozens of tanks destroyed.

Furthermore, the Japanese Navy's Kamishikika base unit had engaged in anti-aircraft combat near the airfield, but on the evening of August 14, they independently decided to retreat to the Ōdō Base without coordinating with the Army. They ignored orders from the Northeast Air Command to cease communication, destroyed their communications equipment, and by the early morning of August 15, blew up anti-aircraft guns before retreating by automobile to the Ōdō Base. Initially, they had planned to defend Ōdō, but upon learning of Japan's acceptance of the Potsdam Declaration, they abandoned combat and boarded the Shumushu to evacuate to Hokkaido along with the base personnel. However, the Toyohara Naval Attaché Office remained behind to protect civilians.

=== August 16: Tōro landing operation ===
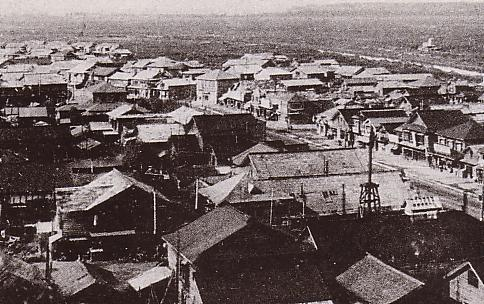
The urban area of Esutoru Town (Hama District)

==== Tōro landing ====
As part of the second-phase operation, the Soviet forces planned the Tōro landing operation near Esutoru Town, the second-largest city in southern Sakhalin. From August 10 onward, Esutoru Harbor and Tōro Harbor became targets for the Soviet Northern Pacific Fleet's air attacks. On August 13, reconnaissance was conducted by torpedo boats and cutter boats, which determined that there was minimal defensive strength. At that time, several boats from ships offshore Esutoru Harbor headed south toward Hama District, but were repelled by the gunfire of the Special Security Unit 301, which forced them to retreat. The landing was originally planned to coincide with a land invasion, but Admiral Vladimir Andreyev of the Soviet Northern Pacific Fleet decided to act independently and initiated the landing on August 16.

Near Esutoru and Tōro Town, when the conflict began, there was only one company of the 125th Infantry Regiment and some rear units stationed. After the Soviet invasion of Anbetsu, the threat of an attack from the Hondo-Anbetsu line arose, so on August 14, the 25th Infantry Regiment sent one regular company (with a machine gun squad) and a training company of rookie soldiers (equipped with a mountain gun) to reinforce the area. Additionally, the Special Security Unit 301, the 8th Special Security Team from Toyohara District, and a volunteer combat unit (including 600 student soldiers and 80 women) were mobilized. Colonel Kenzo Tomizawa, stationed temporarily at the Toyohara District Headquarters, was appointed as the commander. The Japanese forces deployed two regular infantry companies along the narrow path from Esutoru city to Upper Esutoru to establish a defense line, while one squad from Special Security Unit 301 (with 40 volunteers attached) was tasked with destroying the Tōro airfield and guarding Tōro Harbor, while the remainder assisted in evacuating civilians in the city. Many civilians evacuated to Upper Esutoru, and only about 20% remained when the Soviet forces landed at Tōro. The Japanese forces misidentified the Soviet reconnaissance on the 13th as a full-scale landing and believed they had successfully repelled it with fire from the Special Security Unit. However, this misinformation led to panic in the town of Tōro, with rumors circulating on the 15th that the Soviet forces would land soon. The men were armed with bamboo spears and formed into a desperate assault unit, while 1,400 women, children, and elderly people were evacuated to the Mitsubishi Tōro coal mine. Fearing the Soviet forces would commit atrocities, they nearly resorted to mass suicide by blocking the ventilation pipes.

On August 15, the Soviet forces launched four waves of attacks from Sovetskaya Gavan with one patrol vessel, one minesweeper, two transport ships, and several small craft. The morning of August 16, after Japan's acceptance of the Potsdam Declaration, Soviet forces landed quietly with a small number of soldiers. However, the hidden Japanese defenders immediately launched an attack, forcing the Soviet troops to retreat with casualties. As a result, the 365th Naval Infantry Battalion and the 2nd Battalion of the 113th Rifle Brigade, supported by naval gunfire and air cover, began landing at Tōro Harbor. The town of Tōro was set on fire, and one defensive squad was destroyed. Tōro Town Mayor Shōmatsu Abe (also the volunteer combat team leader) and others were sent to negotiate a ceasefire with the Soviet Naval Infantry after being informed of Japan's surrender and cessation of resistance. They were taken hostage and executed shortly thereafter. Civilians trying to evacuate to Upper Esutoru were caught in indiscriminate machine gun fire, leading to numerous casualties.

==== Japanese forces' movements ====
At this time, the residents of Esutoru criticized the military for fleeing first. According to Colonel Yasuo Suzuki, chief of staff of the 88th Division, a special security unit was formed from 200 local veterans, and three additional companies were quickly sent to the Esutoru area upon hearing that the enemy was attempting to land on the 13th. Major Tadashi Yoshino was appointed as the overall commander. However, Suzuki believed that if the Soviet forces launched a full-scale landing, the situation would be hopeless, so he instructed that the defense be moved to Upper Esutoru, located 24 kilometers inland on a mountain. Suzuki also claimed that the Special Security Unit should have already retreated to Upper Esutoru by the 16th, arguing that this was a combat strategy. When Yoshino arrived in Upper Esutoru, he found the soldiers unwilling to surrender their guns, and in order to avoid unnecessary conflict, he had them withdraw to the Baiun Gorge, a watershed area. There, they sheltered in the mountains to avoid endangering civilians fleeing, but on the 24th, after receiving orders from division headquarters, they surrendered to the Soviet forces. This account omits the order from the Northern Army Commander, Lieutenant General Higuchi, to defend southern Sakhalin at all costs.

==== The Battle of Esutoru ====
The Special Security Unit and the volunteer combat team achieved considerable success in defending the urban area of Esutoru. The 301st Special Security Unit (led by Captain Shigeo Nakagaki) gathered rookies, regional security teams, civilian volunteer combat units, and police forces to form a defensive line at the entrance of Esutoru's city, providing assistance for civilian evacuation. At 2:00 pm on the 16th, Soviet forces occupied the Ōji Paper Mill on the evacuation route between Esutoru and Upper Esutoru, blocking the road, but the local government and volunteer forces (400 people) used a mountain path to reach Upper Esutoru. The route from Tōro to Esutoru was called the "Straight Road," located in a tundra area with shrubs and flowers, 4 kilometers south. Nakagaki's unit, consisting of the Special Security Unit and the volunteer combat unit, halted the Soviet 2nd and 3rd Naval Infantry Battalions advancing south from Tōro and launched a counterattack, forcing them to retreat. The Soviets set fire to the factory to cover their retreat, but the wooden barracks quickly burned down, and the fleeing Soviet forces were destroyed by Nakagaki's unit. Afterward, Nakagaki’s unit escorted the 400 evacuees from Esutoru and arrived in Upper Esutoru by 3:00 am on the 17th. However, other volunteer units in the city failed to execute orders effectively, possibly due to poor communication. At 7:00 am on August 17, the Soviet forces occupied Esutoru's city center and, by 10:30 am, took Hama District. According to Soviet records, there was fighting in Esutoru on the 17th, though it is believed that no regular Japanese forces remained at that point. However, there is limited information available on the actions of the volunteer units, and much remains speculative. While the local leaders and Nakagaki's main unit managed to evacuate, other volunteer units are presumed to have been destroyed. According to author and critic Teruko Yoshitake, Esutoru was an important defensive position, with a volunteer force led by local officials and student soldiers, as well as women’s units, fighting fiercely with bamboo spears, resulting in casualties.

==== Women's Watchtower Units' activities ====
At the Esutoru watchtower position, twelve female soldiers from the Women's Watchtower Unit became isolated. Meanwhile, Captain Nakagaki of the Special Security Unit, stationed in the city, was surprised when he received a phone call in Russian (the telephone line had been cut and repurposed by the Soviets). He rushed to their rescue and found the women, who had decided to commit suicide, and convinced them to attempt an escape to Upper Esutoru. He sent a small team of soldiers to accompany them. Meanwhile, other women from the Women's Watchtower Unit, who had retreated to Upper Esutoru, decided to go back to rescue their comrades and brought a total of 36 soldiers with them, demanding the security unit help. They were able to take a truck to Esutoru, but, after some miscommunication, the 36 soldiers reached Upper Esutoru while the others, encountering families along the way, continued and broke through Soviet lines to arrive at Hama District. There, they reunited with Sergeant Sato and confirmed that the watchtower unit had already disappeared. Local police joined the rescue effort, and they carried injured soldiers on makeshift stretchers through the mountains to Upper Esutoru. Afterward, these women also evacuated to Toyohara, where they would soon face further hardships from other Japanese forces.

==== Conclusion ====
The town of Kami-Esutori was bombed and burnt to the ground on the afternoon of 17 August, and as it was evacuated, the Special Security Forces and Volunteer Combat Teams were disbanded with members returning to their families. Negotiations for a ceasefire with the Soviet forces were conducted by Major Teigo Yoshino (who took over command from Colonel Tomizawa), who was dispatched as the general commander of the Esutori area, but no conclusion was reached as the evacuees refused to allow the Soviets to return the residents they had demanded and did not agree to disarmament. The director of the Esutori Branch Office and Major Yoshino judged that the morale of the Japanese soldiers was high and there was a risk of a widening of the battle, and decided to unite the evacuees and military units and move eastwards along the Neiro-Esutori line away from the Soviet forces. On 24 August, when they reached the vicinity of Neiro, a liaison officer from the divisional headquarters arrived and communicated the order to surrender, and the troops accepted the disarmament.

The resistance of the volunteer units on the straight road beyond Esutori was fierce, and the Soviet troops withdrew with many casualties. Before the Soviet attack, there had been an incident in which the volunteer troops executed Koreans on suspicion of spying, and eight members of the volunteer troops were later shot dead by Soviet troops on this road on that charge. Some Japanese have suggested that this was revenge for the Battle of the Straight Road.

=== August 20th – Maoka and Oodōmaru landing operation ===
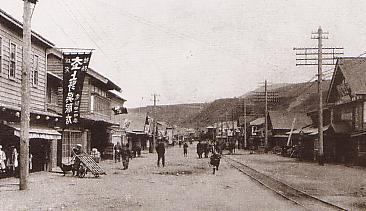
The city of Maoka Town before the Soviet military invasion

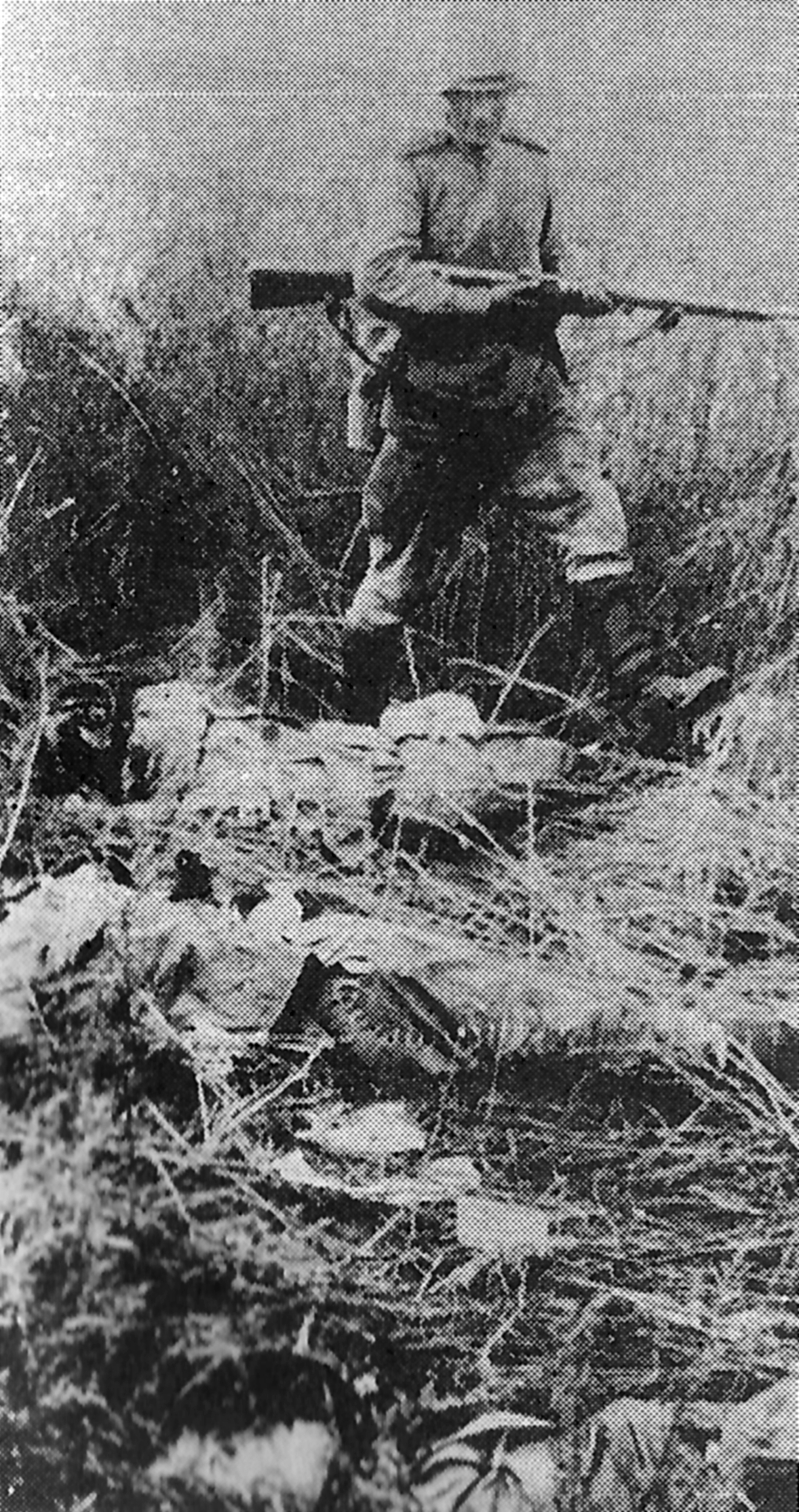
A Soviet soldier advances over the bodies of Japanese soldiers at Mooka and the Kumosa Pass.

==== Situation and background prior to the Soviet landing ====
The Soviet Union had planned the Maoka Landing Operation as an auxiliary operation in the third phase, but in consideration of the situation on the front lines near the border, they ordered the activation of the operation on August 15. The Soviet Union aimed to prevent the repatriation of materials by Japanese civilians to the mainland. In addition to these goals, the operation was intended to secure key bases like Oodōmaru early for the invasion of Hokkaido. The main landing forces, including the 113th Rifle Brigade (about 2,600 men) and a naval mixed infantry battalion (820 men), boarded five transport ships, four minesweepers, and nine patrol boats near the Mamiya Strait on August 18, sailing out the next morning, August 19. The commander of the landing forces was Colonel I. Z. Zaharov of the 113th Rifle Brigade, and the convoy commander was Rear Admiral A. I. Leonov.

On the 20th, Chief of Staff Suzuki of the 88th Division had the first negotiations with the Soviet forces. However, bound by the order to defend Sakhalin from the 5th Far Eastern Army, Suzuki insisted that the Soviet forces refrain from occupying southern Sakhalin, while the Soviet forces insisted on the occupation and full surrender of the Japanese forces. The ceasefire negotiations were unsuccessful.

The Japanese soldiers who had been disarmed at Shika were confirmed to have arrived near Mooka Station on the same day, as confirmed by the testimonies of station personnel. This suggests that, at this point, the Soviets may have believed that the entire Japanese division had already surrendered or was in the process of surrendering. Meanwhile, the Japanese were using Mooka Port as a point for repatriation to the mainland, with the town overflowing with over 15,000 local residents and evacuees. The 25th Infantry Regiment had its main forces stationed for defense, but most of the preparations, such as the burning of military flags and the discharge of older soldiers, were already completed. Only the 1st Battalion of the 25th Infantry Regiment had set up positions on the coast, but on August 16, soldiers were withdrawn from the coastal positions and urban areas and moved inland to camp near Arakeizawa Valley, waiting in reserve. The remaining forces near the city included gendarmerie, a small machine gun and regimental artillery unit, and a few army maritime troops.

The Japanese military prioritized the defense of Toyohara, the location of the command headquarters, as it was seen as the primary target of the Soviet forces advancing from the south. The 25th Infantry Regiment had been deployed just before Toyohara at Osaka. The main routes from Mooka to Toyohara were the Toyohara Mountain Road and the Toyohara Railway. When the Soviet forces landed at Mooka, they would use these routes to move towards Toyohara. The Japanese had planned to use the Arakeizawa and Kumosa Pass as defense lines, as well as the mountains near Toyohara, due to their strategic advantage. The main battle occurred at Kumosa Pass with the 1st Battalion deployed at Arakeizawa.

There was some criticism from Mooka residents regarding the absence of military forces in the town. The 25th Infantry Regiment's 1st Battalion Commander, Major Yoshio Nakagawa, explained to the War History Room at the Ministry of Defense that the decision was based on the assumption that Soviet forces would be peacefully occupying the area, and they wanted to prevent civilian casualties in case of unexpected situations. Furthermore, Regiment Commander General Yamazawa reported that the 1st Battalion's 2nd Company was preparing for disarmament on the morning of the 20th. Despite this, the order to continue defending Sakhalin was not widely known at the time.

==== Soviet forces' landing at Maoka ====
In the early hours of August 20, several Soviet ships appeared off the coast of Maoka. At around 6:00 am, a Soviet naval convoy, escorted by one patrol vessel and one minesweeper, began their landing at Maoka, firing a salute of blank shots. The Soviet forces, having encountered a torpedo boat that had run aground in the shallow waters and was fired upon with live ammunition by the Japanese forces, responded with naval gunfire. The Japanese side, however, recorded witnessing the boat’s grounding but did not return fire. At that time, Lieutenant Hirose, who was in charge of the regiment’s artillery unit in the Arakaisawa area, observed the Soviet fleet's appearance off Maoka early in the morning on the 20th and saw landing boats charging forward, but despite making contact by phone, he was told that shooting was prohibited and could not engage. According to Sergeant Maeda of Hirose’s unit, they were stationed on a coastal terrace about 150 meters behind the northern Maoka fishing port and saw the Soviet forces firing live rounds first. However, there were testimonies from soldiers of the 1st Machine Gun Platoon dispatched to Maoka that the platoon leader ordered live rounds in response to blank shots, and letters sent to the battalion adjutant by soldiers of the 25th Infantry Regiment indicated that Japanese forces may have initiated the live-fire response. According to Takatoshi Michishita's post-war account, Soviet soldiers initially landed leisurely on small boats while laughing, but as Soviet warships fired blank shots, Japanese forces began live-fire attacks, and a shelling battle ensued. Former Sakhalin newspaper editorial director Ryuuji Hoshino and Hokkaido Shimbun’s Maoka branch chief Yasuji Fujii are also said to have confirmed these accounts. The Soviet forces, supported by naval gunfire, advanced and occupied the port area by around noon and the city center by around 2:00 pm according to Soviet records. The cargo ship Kotsukimaru and various fishing boats within the harbor were either captured or sunk. According to Japanese records, the Japanese forces prohibited any firing and retreated inland to higher ground, guiding civilians toward Toyohara while distributing military supplies.

Soviet records state that in urban combat, they eliminated Japanese forces holed up in buildings and basements, causing over 300 casualties and taking more than 600 prisoners, but Japanese records mention that there were no defensive positions in Maoka city, and the Japanese forces did not return fire. Therefore, it is suggested that the victims were civilians, particularly those wearing Kokumin-fuku (national uniforms) similar to military clothing. (In fact, almost all able-bodied men were temporarily detained in coastal warehouses.) Some speculate that the Soviet forces, thinking of the air raid shelters as fortified positions, may have attacked them without properly checking who was inside, instead using gunfire or grenades. There are several testimonies of such incidents, and it is said that clearly identifiable bodies of civilians were found.

Nevertheless, aside from the 10 members of Hirose’s unit stationed in the northern suburbs, Maoka Town was also defended by one mountain artillery squad and two anti-aircraft machine guns for port and air defense, and Special Guard Unit 305 was responsible for security. Additionally, about 30 soldiers of the Akatsuki Unit (a naval transportation unit) and about 40 air defense watchers, totaling around one to two hundred soldiers, were stationed in the town. As soon as the shelling started, it is believed all forces quickly fled. In Esutoru, volunteer fighting squads also resisted, but there are no testimonies from residents regarding volunteer or special guard units in Maoka, and it is thought that these groups disbanded without taking action. On the day of the occupation, the Soviet forces reportedly called local leaders to the beach and executed them by shooting (Mayor Katsujirou Takahashi survived with serious injuries). It is suggested that those wearing national uniforms, civil defense uniforms, combat helmets, or khaki clothing were mistaken for soldiers and shot. In one memoir, it is written that Mayor Takahashi, dressed in national clothing and wearing gaiters, was also mistaken for a soldier and shot.

The police chief, along with his subordinates, were captured by Soviet soldiers and confined, while the military police commander evacuated with his men to Toyohara when shelling started. The head of the local government also fled his office and walked to Toyohara via the mountains and highways. As a result, the town could no longer take any coordinated action or negotiate with the Soviet forces.

==== Tragedy inside and outside the city ====
In Moaka, not only was there the mass suicide of female employees during the Maoka Post and Telegraph Office Incident, but other incidents where teachers and military instructors at the local middle school and elementary school also committed suicide with their families, with other civilians trying to commit family suicides. Further tragic events occurred where people, having fled to air raid shelters, were forced by those around them to either leave or kill their children because the children began crying and Soviets soldiers were nearby. In one instance, a retired military veteran's family committed suicide, and a neighbor, who was an acquaintance of the deceased, did not mention the deaths of the wife and child when speaking with the husband, who was also a former soldier and a colleague of the deceased instructor. The reporter and military instructor later praised the deceased instructor's family for their heroic actions, with the military instructor encouraging the husband to convey the news of his colleague's death to the instructor's child. The Soviet forces reported 60 soldiers and 17 naval infantrymen dead or wounded. It is said that approximately 1,000 Japanese citizens died in Maoka, and evacuation ships were also attacked.

==== End of chaos in Moaka ====
According to a former member of the police training facility, early on the 20th, after receiving a phone call, the police chief went to see the Soviet naval convoy cruising off the northern coast of Maoka. As the convoy moved toward Maoka, the police chief panicked and immediately called for an emergency gathering of personnel. According to the police chief’s memoir, he led a delegation waving a white flag to the port to begin peace talks with the Soviet forces, but his station was shot at. The police chief took refuge in an air raid shelter. Some police officers ran upstairs, jumped from the building, and managed to escape, but some were shot by Soviet soldiers, meanwhile others took refuge in the basement jail. Eventually, they were found by the Soviets and taken to the beach. On the beach, women and children were sent back, but all men aged 16 and older wearing national uniforms, civil defense uniforms, combat helmets, or khaki clothing were lined up on the breakwater and shot by machine gun fire, viewed as soldiers.

A female restaurant owner, who had taken refuge in an air raid shelter, saw bullets flying inside and, realizing she could not avoid them, heard a Soviet soldier calling for her to "raise your hands and come out." She went outside and was captured by the Soviets. Seeing bloodied women lying on the ground and fires starting around her, she shouted loudly, urging those inside to come out immediately or risk burning to death, and telling people to take off their uniforms to avoid being mistaken for soldiers. As the Soviets set the area on fire, she, while being led away, heard the police chief decide to surrender. He and his subordinates left the shelter and were arrested by Soviet soldiers and taken to the beach.

It is believed that by 2:00 pm on the 20th, Maoka city and the port were effectively occupied.

==== Actions of the Japanese military units ====
The Soviet troops further advanced, and in the mountains of Arakaisawa, north of Maoka, a full-scale hand-to-hand battle between regular soldiers began.

Lieutenant Colonel Nakagawa, commanding the 1st Battalion of the Japanese 25th Infantry Regiment, learned of the Soviet naval vessels' approach through communication on the night or early morning, prepared a white flag, and made arrangements for a military envoy. He later claimed that it was through the sound of Soviet artillery that he realized the Soviet attack on Maoka had begun. Regimental Commander Yamazawa of the 25th Infantry Regiment also learned of the Maoka attack from the sounds of artillery and criticized the Soviet forces for unilaterally landing and attacking Maoka, even shooting dead the military envoy. He further stated that it was difficult to believe that the Japanese military stationed at Maoka had fired live rounds first. Notably, there is no mention of Commander Higuchi's order to defend South Sakhalin or the Imperial General Headquarters' permission for defensive combat in the testimonies of Lieutenant Colonel Nakagawa and Colonel Yamazawa, as reported by Yomiuri Shimbun. Yamazawa seems to speak ambiguously on the matter of "defensive combat," perhaps hinting at the lawful justification of self-defense or emergency measures in the context of criminal law (Research by the suggests that the Imperial General Headquarters' directives regarding defensive combat were more clearly stated). In response to inquiries, Nakagawa later explained that the "defensive combat" was in line with the military's established regulations under the Guard Duty Order, as recognized by both Yomiuri Shimbun and the War History Room.

==== Shooting of the military envoy ====
Lieutenant Colonel Nakagawa, commanding the 1st Battalion of the 25th Infantry Regiment, sent out a military envoy. However, the envoy, including Lieutenant Murata Tokubei, was stopped by Soviet soldiers en route and shot dead. The envoy consisted of 13 men, including guard dogs, and to prevent unforeseen events in the thick fog, sentries were posted every 50 meters. Lieutenant Takahashi Shin of the 2nd Company was perplexed as to why so many soldiers were assigned to the envoy, and upon hearing of their deaths, expressed regret, suspecting that the envoy had, from the beginning, entered Soviet-controlled territory under the guise of ceasefire negotiations and had planned to ambush Soviet officers, starting a battle or attempting an escape. He surmised that the Japanese military had no intention of truly negotiating a ceasefire. Regarding the dispatch of the military envoy, former Regimental Commander Yamazawa later stated in response to inquiries that he had not ordered it and believed it was Nakagawa's independent decision. He acknowledged, however, that even if it was done unilaterally, it was a reasonable measure, and Nakagawa admitted that it was, indeed, his own decision.

==== Enactment of the Guard Duty Order ====
Lieutenant Colonel Nakagawa, commander of the 1st Battalion, initially believed that the Soviet forces would peacefully occupy the region, but after the failure of ceasefire negotiations, he stated that, under orders from his regimental commander, the use of weapons continued under the Guard Duty Order. However, this statement appears to conflict with the direct orders from Army Commander Higuchi to defend South Sakhalin, suggesting that Nakagawa's comment might have been influenced by his desire to avoid contradicting Commander Higuchi's directives, especially since combat occurred in violation of the General Staff's ceasefire orders.

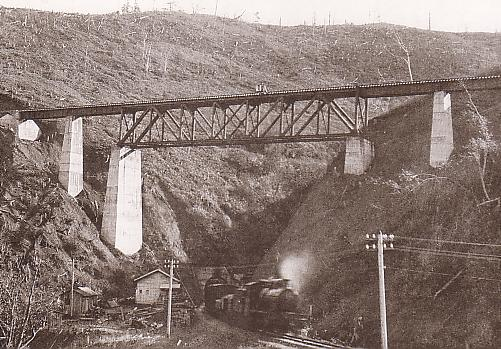
The Tōhō Line's Takaradai Loop, where the Soviet landing forces and Japanese troops engaged in combat near Maoka on August 21–22

After observing Soviet actions, the Japanese forces, under the provisions of the Guard Duty Order Articles 12 and 13 (concerning security duties), authorized limited use of weapons and clashed with Soviet troops around 3:30 pm on August 20. However, the statements regarding the use of the Guard Duty Order are based on earlier testimonies (which mistakenly referred to Article 11, Paragraph 2). The 1971 War History Series widely publicized the orders from Army Commander Higuchi to defend South Sakhalin. However, for a long time, this remained largely unknown to the general public, and the statements regarding the Guard Duty Order inadvertently obscured Higuchi's defense orders.

==== Actions after the occupation of Maoka ====
On August 21, the Soviet forces began advancing toward Toyohara, attacking the Japanese 1st Battalion of the 25th Infantry Regiment. The Japanese forces retaliated, but they were gradually pushed back, eventually retreating to Ōsaka Station by nightfall. A new 3rd Battalion was deployed at Kumasasa Pass and the Takaradai Loop. The Soviet forces, advancing with airstrikes and naval gunfire, pushed forward, while the Japanese forces, including medics, engaged in hand-to-hand combat. The Japanese forces conducted a delaying action until August 22, as they aimed to defend Toyohara, where the division headquarters were located.

At the same time, Japanese civilians in Maoka, who were trying to escape through the port, found themselves trapped alongside the local Japanese population. Though over 200 Japanese soldiers, armed with artillery, were stationed at Kumasasa Pass near Maoka, they were solely tasked with defending Toyohara, not Maoka itself.

Meanwhile, a mass murder incident (the Mizuho Incident) occurred in a rural settlement near Maoka, when Japanese farmers, fearing that Koreans were engaging in espionage for the Soviets or might loot from them, massacred a large group of Koreans in the same settlement.

Following the occupation of Maoka, Soviet forces began releasing some Japanese prisoners, but many of them, fearing the prospect of occupation, chose to start fires. Maoka was eventually left in ruins, with two-thirds of the town reportedly burned down. Soviet forces executed several men caught starting the fires, displayed their bodies before other prisoners, and then disposed of them by throwing them into the sea.

==== Damage in Ōsaka and Toyohara ====
By August 20, airstrikes had begun against the Toyohara Station, which was displaying white flags and Red Cross flags.

By August 21, the flow of evacuees from Ōsaka stopped, and the town was subjected to relentless airstrikes by Soviet planes. While the source of the fires is unclear, whether caused by airstrikes or Japanese scorched earth tactics, by August 22, fires broke out across the town, leaving only a few buildings such as schools and the post office intact.

On August 22, Toyohara also came under bombardment, with the area around the station square, where evacuees had gathered, being bombarded with incendiary bombs, resulting in over 100 casualties and the destruction of around 400 homes. Despite the white flags on many of the rooftops, Soviet forces launched multiple strikes. The airstrikes began at around 11:50 am, persistently continuing for about 20 minutes. According to Japanese military reports, the bombings lasted until 3:30 pm, with 400-500 deaths reported. Most witnesses agree that the attacks took place around noon. While there are no international laws governing such actions, it was customary for combat to cease during such ceasefire negotiations. Although Japan had agreed to the Potsdam Declaration, Soviet planes violated this agreement, however according to historian Nikolai Vishnevsky, the aircraft took off from the Russian Far East, and news of the ceasefire negotiations had not yet reached them in time.

=== Until the ceasefire agreement ===
On August 19, the Japanese Imperial General Headquarters allowed the 5th Area Army to begin ceasefire negotiations and weapons surrender. This order was issued three days later than in Manchuria. However, on August 19 at 17:30, the 5th Area Army in Hokkaido ordered the 88th Division to defend southern Sakhalin till the last man, and to continue fighting if Soviet forces moved in (as detailed in Far East Special Telegram No. 28). In this context, the continuation of self-defense combat, which should have ended with the ceasefire negotiations, was ordered, and the defense of southern Sakhalin until the end was fully assumed.

On August 19, during a meeting with the Soviet supreme commander in the East, the Kwantung Army in Manchuria learned that combat was still ongoing in Sakhalin. On the 20th, a telegram (Kantou General Staff's War Telegram No. 1045) requesting urgent action was sent to the Imperial General Headquarters and the 5th Area Army. In response, the 5th Area Army sent a telegram back to the Kwantung Army stating that “the Soviet forces' unlawful actions are truly excessive” and that “the Soviet supreme commander must issue strict orders”. However, on August 21, Major General Minegi of the 88th Division explained over the phone to the Chief of Staff of the 5th Area Army, Saburou Hagi, that the Soviet forces were unwilling to stop their advance, and that, in order to avoid a full-scale confrontation, they would have to accept disarmament and allow the Soviet forces' occupation. He requested approval from Commander Higuchi, which was granted. This was likely due to a stern warning received by the 5th Area Army from General Staff Officer Shigefuru Asao, who had gone to Manchuria for ceasefire negotiations, on August 21, urging against continuing combat under the pretext of self-defense.

On August 22, the 5th Area Army transmitted the weapons surrender approval from the Imperial General Headquarters to the 88th Division, replacing the previous order to defend southern Sakhalin, and a ceasefire agreement was reached with the Soviet forces at Chitose Town.

After the occupation, the Soviets attempted to prevent the repatriation of Japanese citizens and property to the Japanese mainland, and on the 23rd, they announced a ban on moving off the island. On the 24th, the Soviet forces occupied Toyohara, the capital of Sakhalin Prefecture, and by the 25th, with the landing at Odomari, the occupation of southern Sakhalin was completed.

==== On self-defense combat ====
The term "self-defense combat" did not exist as an official term prior. In international law, there is a term for "self-defense war," which includes battles for territorial defense. However, when the Imperial General Headquarters used this term, combat continued against the Soviet forces in Manchuria, and it was intended to apply only if attacks occurred during ceasefire negotiations, assuming surrender under the Potsdam Declaration. This was a step beyond the earlier orders to cease active combat, limiting it to defensive war. The testimony of Colonel Nakagawa, made when Commander Higuchi's order to defend Sakhalin was not publicly known, was based on disarmament and the assumption of Soviet forces' occupation. This self-defense was closer to the concept of self-defense or emergency escape in criminal law.

However, Major General Yasuo Suzuki of the 88th Division asked Lieutenant Iwai of the General Staff about self-defense combat. Iwai replied that in a military occupation, there was a risk of confiscation of residents' property, but in the case of occupation, international law protected residents' property, and thus, the proper procedure was to wait for an official ceasefire agreement by the government (not the military), not to continue fighting to halt the enemy's advance. In fact, the situation was quite different. Article 43 of the Hague Regulations on Land Warfare (as referred to in the Hague Regulations) states that during a ceasefire (referred to as a suspension of hostilities), the occupying power must respect the current laws of the occupied territory to the greatest extent possible. Article 46 further ensures the protection of private property. Rather than regarding the situation as an occupation, the terms of a ceasefire agreement or peace treaty would define reparations, territories, and other aspects, regardless of the occupied areas. It is noted that Lieutenant Ito, who was not familiar with this issue, gave his personal view on the matter and did not confirm it with higher commands or the division itself. The Ministry of Defense did not comment on the correctness of Ito's argument, nor does it address Article 46 of the Hague Regulations.

=== August 22–23: Disarmament and end of combat ===
The Soviet supreme commander informed the Kwantung Army in Manchuria that combat was still ongoing in Sakhalin. On August 21, a telegram from Shigeharu Asao, a staff officer at the Imperial General Headquarters who was on a business trip to Manchuria, arrived at the General Headquarters and the 5th Area Army in Sapporo, stating, "If combat continues under the guise of self-defense, the soldiers of Manchuria and the Northeastern regions will suffer unimaginable hardships thereafter". In response to this directive, the 5th Area Army in Sapporo immediately reversed its previous order to defend Sakhalin to the last man and issued a ceasefire order to the 88th Division. Since important orders were always delivered in person, Major General Hoshikoma Taro, Deputy Chief of Staff, was sent from the 5th Area Army to Sakhalin to ensure the ceasefire order was communicated properly. Careful preparations were made for his mission, such as flying at night to avoid being shot down by Soviet forces and ensuring the involvement of the 5th Area Army in the Sakhalin conflict remained undetected to avoid provoking retaliation against Hokkaido. There were even considerations to disguise the command structure between the 5th Area Army and the 88th Division in Sakhalin as separate. While efforts were made to conceal the involvement of the 5th Area Army, Major General Hoshikoma's post-war testimony suggested that the failure to cease combat was not their responsibility but rather that of the Soviets. Despite this, the Kwantung Army in Manchuria continued to send telegrams, claiming that they would face retaliation if they did not stop the fighting. The General Staff also sent a telegram warning that continued fighting would hinder the processing of the end of the war. Meanwhile, the local forces in Sakhalin were still acting aggressively, boasting about their victories and showing no intention to stop the combat. All these developments seemed to place the blame on others for the continued conflict.

Negotiations began around 10:30 am on the same day, and by 12:10 pm, a ceasefire agreement was reached between Major General Suzuki, Chief of Staff of the 88th Division, and Soviet Major General Arimov at the Chitose Fire Station.

Later in the evening, a surrender order from the 88th Division Command was sent to the 25th Infantry Regiment of Aisaka, and by August 23, the disarmament process was completed. During these negotiations, it is likely that the military representatives encountered unexpected challenges, as one of them was injured or killed in a gunfight while returning. Based on a note brought back by the surviving representative from the Soviet forces, negotiations continued and were ultimately concluded when the regiment commander visited the Soviet forces to meet their demands. During the subsequent occupation of Toyohara, a naval military attache from the Navy, who had been dispatched as a military representative, was shot and killed after allegedly attempting to attack with a sword during negotiations.

Initial post-ceasefire investigations indicated that 137 men of the 88th Division had died in the Battle of Moji, but later investigations estimated the total casualties to be over 300.

On the morning of August 23, Soviet forces launched a combined naval infantry brigade (three battalions) from Moji, which landed at Odomari on August 25 via the Hon-to route. There was no resistance from the Japanese military, and naval bases like the Odomari base were occupied. Additionally, the small airfield at Konotoro, located north of Moji, was occupied by Soviet Navy paratroopers who performed an emergency landing on August 22.

== Aftermath and casualties ==
The Japanese military casualties are reported as 700 killed in action or 2,000 dead or missing in action. According to Soviet military records, 18,302 Japanese soldiers were taken as prisoners of war. Civilian casualties during the battle are said to have exceeded those of the military, with estimates reaching around 3,700. As a result, the total number of victims, combining both military and civilian, is often cited as approximately 5,000 to 6,000. Notably, the Ministry of Health, Labour and Welfare reports that the total number of war dead in areas such as Sakhalin and the Kuril Islands is 24,400, a figure that includes casualties from battles like the Battle of Attu and the Aleutian Islands Campaign, but the total number of war dead for Sakhalin, the Kuril Islands, and surrounding seas for the entire war period is 18,900.

There were incidents of massacres of Koreans by Japanese military and civilians, including failed attempts. Ei-dai Hayashi argues that the Japanese military, mistaking the presence of many East Asian soldiers in the Soviet army for Korean units, contacted the rear command, which led to the belief that Koreans might be spies linked to the enemy. This fear, combined with rumors, led to numerous Korean massacres being carried out, especially by the military police and gendarmerie, who were fearful of uprisings (Note: Ryoichi Ohashi of the Sakhalin Newspaper, upon visiting the Tahei Coal Mine in Esutori, was told by a local that some Koreans were massacred by certain Japanese civilians at the end of the war, mostly under suspicion of being spies, and that the underlying cause might have been deep-seated prejudice. "Sakhalin 1945 Summer" (Kodansha: 1972) P. 187). On August 23, a military secret telegram from the Chief of Staff of the 5th Army in Sapporo to the Deputy Chief of Staff in Tokyo read: "Taking advantage of this opportunity, the front-line units have taken some countermeasures due to the truly disturbing and vicious acts of certain Koreans, but we have instructed the local units to stand firm on the principle of complete non-resistance for national security.".

Japanese military personnel who survived were subjected to forced labor in Siberian internment camps, except for some who were able to mix with civilians after being repatriated to Hokkaido. Many were sent to Siberia, while others were assigned to labor at prisoner-of-war camps within Sakhalin. Chief of Staff Suzuki was detained in Siberia for 12 years. This period of detainment was among the longest for any of the Siberian internees.

As a result of strictly following the order to defend Sakhalin from the 5th Army of Hokkaido, Suzuki regretted not being able to protect the residents or defend the island and stated, "Was my mission well done? The answer is clearly no." after the outcome. Many Japanese civilians were kept on Sakhalin for about two years after the war.

The Soviet military advanced to use South Sakhalin as a forward base for the planned invasion of Hokkaido and the Kuril Islands. By August 25, a total of three convoys consisting of 15 passenger ships sent three divisions to Maoka. However, the Soviet plan to occupy Hokkaido was halted after President Truman sent a letter to Stalin on August 17, opposing the occupation of Hokkaido, which Stalin accepted on August 18. A ceasefire was reached in Sakhalin on August 22, and military operations in Hokkaido were suspended after August 22. The Soviet occupation of the Northern Territories was carried out by the 113th Rifle Brigade starting on August 28 until September 3. Japanese soldiers captured in the Kuril Islands were sent to Siberia through Sakhalin.

On August 16, Stalin proposed to the United States to divide Hokkaido along a line from Rumoi to Kushiro, with the northeastern part to be occupied by the Soviet Union, beyond the agreements made at the Yalta Conference. However, this was rejected by President Truman, and it is commonly explained that Stalin abandoned the idea after the refusal. Some interpretations, however, suggest that the Japanese resistance in Sakhalin, especially in the Battle of Shumushu in the Kurils, played a key role in halting Soviet plans to occupy Hokkaido. According to former National Defense Medical University professor Takashi Nakayama, the delay of Soviet action was due to Stalin's consideration of whether the occupation of Hokkaido could be established as a fait accompli before the signing of Japan's surrender documents (September 2). Nakayama argued that the delay in securing South Sakhalin and the fierce resistance at Shumushu led to the conclusion that such an occupation was no longer feasible.

Conversely, Sakhalin War researcher Ken'yu Fujimura suggests that the attacks on civilian ships might have been a provocation designed to trigger Japanese retaliation and create a pretext for full-scale military action against Hokkaido. From historical records, it appears that Stalin considered occupying Hokkaido's northern region, but after receiving Truman's rejection, Soviet forces eventually shifted their focus to reinforcing their Kuril Island operations.

After the battle, the Soviet Union (later the Russian Federation after its collapse) effectively controlled southern Sakhalin, while Japan continues to assert the region as an area with disputed territorial status. For more details on the territorial dispute, see Sakhalin.

In total, Japanese casualties are approximately 700 to 2,000 soldiers killed and 3,500 to 3,700 civilians killed. Around 18,202 were captured and many of the Japanese prisoners of war in Sakhalin were sent to labor camps in Siberia and held after the war. At least 100,000 Japanese civilians fled the Soviet occupation during the invasion. The capture of Sakhalin Island proved a necessary prerequisite for the invasion of the Kuril Islands. After the Japanese surrender, Sakhalin Island remained under Soviet control and is now Russian territory, part of Sakhalin Oblast.

== Civilians ==
=== Emergency evacuation ===
At the time of the Soviet invasion of Southern Sakhalin, approximately 400,000 civilians were residing there, including seasonal workers, and some estimates suggest the number was around 450,000 to 460,000. After the Soviet Union entered the war, evacuation to Hokkaido began, but many civilians were caught in the conflict and suffered casualties.

On August 9, following the Soviet declaration of war against Japan, the Governor of Otsu Sakhalin, the Chief of Staff of the 88th Division, and the Navy Military Attaché confirmed the aforementioned prior agreement and the evacuation of civilians to Hokkaido began. However, as there was no clear prior plan, the Governor of Sakhalin organized a meeting, where the Sakhalin Railway Bureau and the Shipping Operations Association were involved. Though an emergency transport council was convened, the transport plan was only communicated to each municipality on the 12th

According to the "History of the War", the plan drawn up by the Sakhalin Government aimed to evacuate 160,000 individuals, including women aged 14 and above and children aged 13 and below, within 15 days. This evacuation prioritized the elderly, women, and children to clear out non-combatants, and aimed to evacuate individuals deemed physically weaker due to expected food shortages and harsh winter conditions. In reality, the Governor of Sakhalin banned the evacuation of men aged 15–64, as it was considered important to have them participate in the National Volunteer Combat Teams and assist in military efforts. As a result, some non-elderly men and individuals with mobility issues were shot by police while trying to flee.

Meanwhile, some civilians attempted to escape on their own small boats or by forcibly boarding evacuation ships. Some Sakhalin government officials prioritized evacuating their own families, sometimes using military authority to ensure their departure, which later led to criticism from the public.

Official evacuation ships operated under the Sakhalin government were to use 15 ships, including the Soya Maru and the Navy's auxiliary gunboat Shinkou Maru No. 2, with additional ships like Ikimaru and smaller boats for transport from Motobu. Land-based evacuation was conducted via emergency trains and truck transport to the boarding locations. Evacuation ships prioritized passengers from disaster areas, and transport was free of charge.

Residents who received evacuation orders gathered at the departure points, fearful of a repeat of the Nikkō Port Incident.

The first evacuation ship, Soya Maru, departed from Oodōka on the evening of August 13, followed by ships from Motobu on August 18. By August 20, the Soviets had occupied Maoka, and operations from Motobu were canceled due to the escalating danger.

Ultimately, on August 23, the Soviet military issued a prohibition on the movement of civilians from the island, and the emergency evacuations were completed that night with the ships Soya Maru and Kasuga Maru. During this period, on August 22, three ships—Ogasawara Maru, Taito Maru, and Second Shinko Maru—were attacked and sunk by an unidentified submarine off the coast of Hokkaido, resulting in an estimated 1,708 casualties in an incident known as the Mifune Junnann Jiken (Mifune Tragedy) (it is believed that the list of passengers was not properly created, and it is speculated that the actual number of casualties may have been different). Although it was initially presumed to be an attack by a Soviet submarine, Soviet documents later revealed that submarines in the area had indeed attacked these vessels, making this theory nearly certain. On the same day, a ceasefire negotiation took place for Sakhalin, and orders were issued to halt attacks on ships in this region. The orders were encrypted, but they were received by the submarines, although just a few hours too late.

On the following day, August 23, the cargo ship Notoro Maru, also en route to Sakhalin, was reported by Japanese military sources to have been bombed and sunk by a Soviet aircraft in the Soya Strait (it is also suggested that it was torpedoed on August 22). It is commonly said that most of the casualties on the Notoro Maru were the crew members, but it is also reported that the ship was carrying several hundred evacuees from Honcho (Nevelsk) in Sakhalin to Odomari, and it was sunk near Wakkanai.

Other evacuations were carried out by numerous ships, both large and small. As a result, it is believed that around 76,000 people successfully evacuated the island—about half of the intended target. When combined with the roughly 24,000 people who managed to escape by clandestine means, less than one-quarter of the Sakhalin population was evacuated. Of the 42 municipalities, only eight had completed evacuations. According to the Ministry of Defense's War History Series, the timing of the evacuation is retrospectively criticized as being too late. Due to the sudden order, preparations were rushed, and in the case of the first evacuation ship, Soya Maru, many government and military personnel took up most of the available spaces, which later drew criticism, similar to the evacuation trains in Manchuria.

=== Summary of casualties ===
Since many administrative records such as population registers were lost, the exact number of casualties is unknown. According to Ministry of Health and Welfare documents, around 2,000 civilians were killed in air raids, naval shelling, and ground combat on the island, including approximately 1,000 in Maoka, 170–180 in Taro, 190 in Esutori, 100 in Toyohara, 70 in Shikuka, and 60 in Ochiai. When the casualties from the emergency evacuation ships are added, the total reaches around 3,700.

Additionally, among the civilians who were unable to evacuate or were left behind, some chose to commit suicide to avoid capture by Soviet forces. On August 20, 12 female postal workers attempted a mass suicide in the Maoka Post and Telegraph Office Incident. Similarly, during the Taro landing operation, 23 nurses from the Ohira Coal Mine Hospital attempted collective suicide, six of whom died in the Sakhalin Nurses Mass Suicide Incident.

On the other hand, during the Battle of Esutori on August 16, 12 female watch-post personnel were saved by a special security unit led by Sergeant Nakagaki, who managed to persuade them not to commit suicide, helping them retreat under guard. These women ultimately escaped to Toyohara, and after the complete surrender of Sakhalin, when the reopening of brothels was planned to appease Soviet soldiers, the Japanese military forced the women to work in the brothels, although Sergeant Sato managed to help them later escape under the cover of night.

Amidst the chaos, rumors spread about Koreans acting as spies or committing acts of violence and looting, resulting in fear and panic. This led to incidents of massacres and failed attempts at mass killings of Koreans, including the Nagoyama Village Koreans Massacre, the Mizuho Incident, and the Kamishikuka Incident.

=== Post-ceasefire ===
On August 23, 1945, the Soviet Union prohibited the movement of civilians from Sakhalin Island, and those who could not escape were placed under Soviet administration. The evacuation of civilians, mainly the repatriates, began in earnest in December 1946 with the Hakodate Assistance Bureau responsible for their reception in Japan. Up until the fifth wave of repatriation in June–July 1949, a total of 20 repatriation ships were deployed, and 279,356 people, including both military and civilian personnel from Sakhalin, crossed over to Hokkaido, along with 13,404 people from the Kuril Islands. According to Ministry of Health, Labor, and Welfare data from January 1, 2006, the total number of repatriates, including those from the Kuril Islands, was 16,006 soldiers and military personnel, and 277,540 civilians.

Because many of the evacuees had lived in Sakhalin for a long time, a significant proportion of them (about one-third) had no connections whatsoever to mainland Japan. This made it difficult for them to secure housing and employment, and many had to stay in repatriation assistance dormitories for a long period. More than 1,000 repatriates died while staying in Hakodate without any guarantee of support, in addition to those who perished during the voyage. In 1948, the National Sakhalin Federation was established to provide mutual assistance for the repatriates and their families.

After the Soviet occupation, about 23,000 ethnic Koreans remained on Sakhalin, most of whom were kept there by Soviet authorities. By June 1952, the number of these local ethnic Koreans had increased to 27,000. Many of them, along with ethnic Koreans who had migrated from North Korea or been forcibly relocated from Central Asia by the Soviets, became known as the Zai-Sakhalin Koreans. Many were forced to settle permanently in the region.

Even among the Japanese population, some chose to remain in Sakhalin due to economic reasons and by marrying ethnic Koreans or Russians. By the mid-1990s, around 300 of these descendants born after the war were still living in Sakhalin. However, due to aging and emigration to Japan or South Korea after the collapse of the Soviet Union, this number had decreased to only around 200 by 2010. The Japanese government carried out a collective temporary repatriation program for these remaining inhabitants, enabling periodic returns to Japan about once every 18 months.

== See also ==
- Battle of Shumshu
- Evacuation of Karafuto and Kuriles
- Project Hula
- Soviet assault on Maoka
- Invasion of the Kuril Islands
