= 88th Division (Imperial Japanese Army) =

- 第88師団
- Active: 1945 - 1945
- Country: Empire of Japan
- Branch: Imperial Japanese Army
- Type: Infantry
- Size: 20,000
- Garrison/HQ: Toyohara
- Nickname: Essential Division - Kaname Division
- Engagements: Soviet invasion of Manchuria; Invasion of South Sakhalin

The 88th Division (第88師団, Dai-hachijūhachi Shidan) was an infantry division in the Imperial Japanese Army. Its call sign was the Essential Division (要兵団, Kaname Heidan). It was created 28 February 1945 in Toyohara (later known as Yuzhno-Sakhalinsk.) It was a triangular division. The divisional backbone was the Karafuto mixed brigade.

== Action ==
The 88th Division was assigned to the 5th area army upon formation. With the Soviet invasion of Manchuria plans becoming obvious, the division received an action plan for the expected battle 3 August 1945.

The Soviet forces started the attack by shelling Poronaysk (Sisukacho) town 9 August 1945. The division firmly maintained its positions until 15 August 1945. The 125th Infantry Regiment fought off Red Army attacked with particular distinction. Japanese forces lost 568 men killed, and an estimated over one thousand deaths plus several dozens tanks in return.

The Japanese defense broke Karafuto Fortress defensive line only after 20 August 1945, when the Red Army landed an additional forces in Kholmsk (Maoka). Although the division have received an order to surrender after losing Poronaysk (Sisukacho) town 22 August 1945, negotiations with the Soviets broke down for some time. In the persistent killing frenzy, the elements of the Red Army near Kholmsk (Maoka) has massacred over 100 officers and soldiers under the white flag of surrender, and over 500 soldiers trying to surrender overall. Russian sources are attributing continued massacre to the Japanese soldiers continuing to fight under alleged "secret orders" from the Japanese government.

Overall, 18,320 soldiers of the 88th division and Koton Fortified Region were taken prisoner. The majority of prisoners were moved to labor camps in Siberia, while other prisoners were used in Sakhalin labor camps.

== References and further reading ==
- List of Japanese Infantry Divisions
- Madej, W. Victor. Japanese Armed Forces Order of Battle, 1937-1945 [2 vols] Allentown, PA: 1981

This article incorporates material from the article 第88師団 (日本軍) in the Japanese Wikipedia, retrieved on 21 June 2016.
