= Soviet assault on Maoka =

Military action

- Part of the Invasion of South Sakhalin in the Soviet–Japanese War of World War II
- Map of the Invasion of South Sakhalin, with Maoka in the bottom left
Date	19–22 August 1945
Location	Maoka, South Sakhalin
Result	Soviet victory

Belligerents
Soviet Union	Japan

Commanders and leaders
M.A. Purkayev	Kiichiro Higuchi

Strength
3,400 men	2 battalions

Casualties and losses
77 killed	300 killed 600 captured
- 600–1,000 civilians killed

The Soviet assault on Maoka (Maoka Landing, Russian: Десант в порт Маока) was carried out at the port of Maoka (now Kholmsk), Southern Sakhalin during August 19-22, 1945, by the forces of the Soviet Northern Pacific Flotilla of the Pacific Fleet during the South Sakhalin Offensive of the Soviet–Japanese War at the end of World War II. It was the second amphibious assault on South Sakhalin, after the Soviet assault on Toro (now Shakhtyorsk) on August 16.

== Assault ==
Japanese forces in the port and the city had two battalions of infantry, artillery and mortar units, and coast guard. All of them were subordinate to the commander of the 88th Infantry Division of the Fifth Area Army.

After a Soviet submarine and aviation reconnaissance on August 17, on August 19, an amphibious force of the 113th Rifle Brigade and a battalion of marines of total force of 3,400 moved out from Sovetskaya Gavan and landed at Maoka early morning on August 20. Due to heavy fog, there was no aviation support, and instead the city was subject to heavy artillery bombardment from ships. Due to initial surprise, the coastal facilities were quickly occupied, but later the Soviet troops, according to the Soviet sources, were met with fierce Japanese resistance. However the Japanese side states that their military tried to avoid engagement keeping defensive positions, busy with evacuation of equipment (described as "looting the city" in some Soviet sources) and guiding the evacuation of about 18,000 civilians.

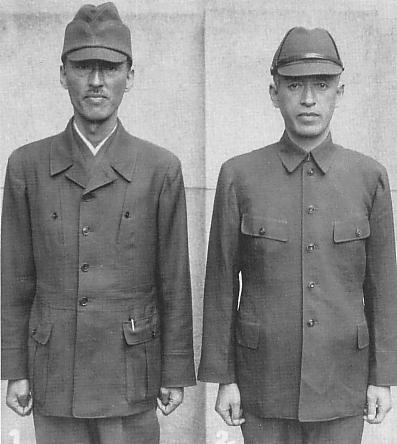
Civilian men wearing kokumin-fuku were confused for military.

After the success of the assault, during August 22-24, Soviet reinforcements arrived from Vladivostok and proceeded to clear the Japanese forces from South Sakhalin. According to refugees already evacuated from the area, Soviet forces carried out fierce naval bombardment and artillery strikes against Japanese installations in Maoka, Shikuka and civilians who were awaiting evacuation. Nearly 1,000 civilians were killed in this attack. Witnesses reported that to a high level of fatalities among civilians were caused by the confusion of European-style kokumin-fuku, men's approved civil attire, with military uniforms.

A number of telephone operators of the city post office pledged not to evacuate and maintained contact with the city of Wakkanai on Hokkaido, as well as mainland Japan, until the moment that Soviet forces destroyed the telephone and postal installations in the city. On August 20, fearing that they would be raped by the invading Soviet troops, nine of the twelve female operators poisoned themselves. Three were saved by male colleagues' intervention. The survivors at the post office were treated well by the Soviets. In Japan it is known as the Maoka post office incident. The city of Wakkanai has a memorial to these post office operators.

On August 21, the weather permitted the operation of aviation, nevertheless the Japanese continued the resistance following the order to cover the evacuation.

== In popular culture ==
- Karafuto 1945 Summer Hyosetsu no Mon
- Kiri no Hi
