= Kokumin-fuku =

1940s civilian uniform in Japan

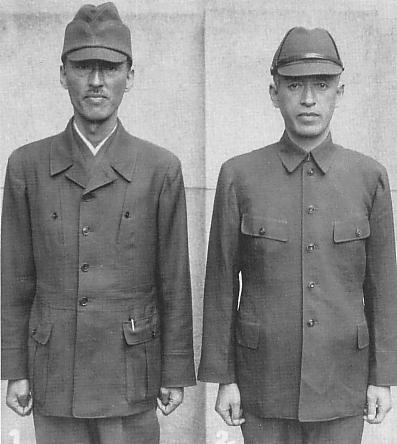
Kokumin-fuku

The kokumin-fuku (国民服, lit. 'national uniform') was the European-style men's civil uniform introduced in Japan in 1940 during World War II. A similar-looking uniform was earlier introduced in Manchuria and was known as kyowa-fuku (協和服) or kai-fuku (会服).

Its similarity to a military uniform was allegedly one of the reasons for the large number of killed Japanese civilians when the Soviet army attacked in 1945, see, e.g., Soviet assault on Maoka.
