= 2nd Far Eastern Front =

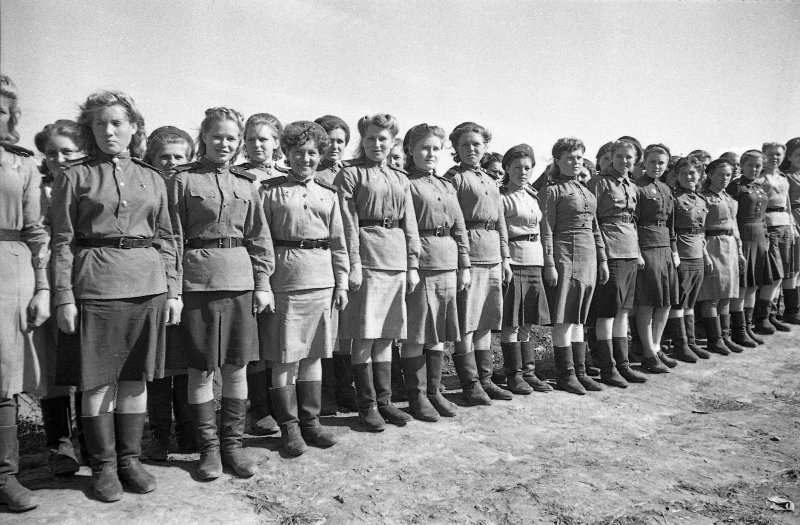
- Female soldiers of the 2nd Far Eastern Front prior to demobilisation, 1945
- Active: 5 August – 1 October 1945
- Country: Soviet Union
- Branch: Red Army
- Type: Army group
- Size: Several Armies
- Engagements: Soviet invasion of Manchuria; Invasion of South Sakhalin; Invasion of the Kuril Islands; Proposed Soviet invasion of Hokkaido

Commanders
- Notable commanders: Maksim Purkayev

The 2nd Far Eastern Front (Russian: 2-й Дальневосточный фронт, romanized: 2-y Dal'nevostochnyy front) was a front—a formation equivalent to a Western Army Group—of the Soviet Army. It was formed just prior to the Soviet invasion of Manchuria and was active from August 5, 1945, until October 1, 1945.

== History ==
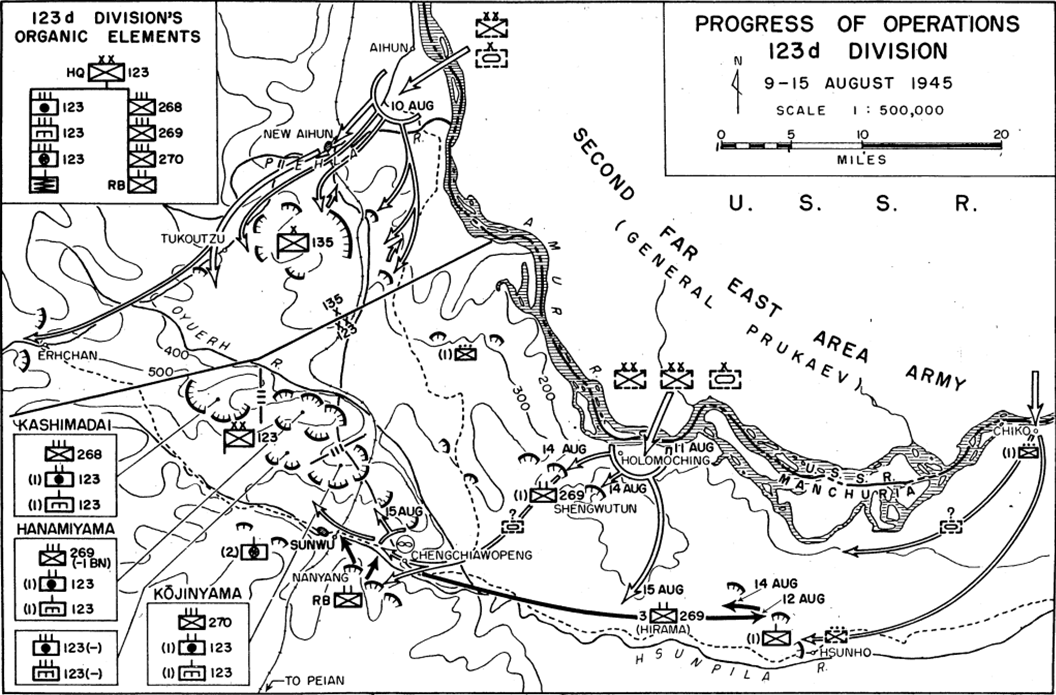
Action of the 2nd Far Eastern Front, 9–15 August 1945

Shortly after its creation, the 2nd Far East Front was committed to the fighting against the Japanese First and Fifth Area Armies and the Japanese Fourth Army in Manchuria, Sakhalin and the Kuril Islands. In Manchuria, soldiers of the front swiftly crossed the Amur and Ussuri rivers, destroying all Japanese resistance. On August 20, the front's 15th Army took Harbin. Later, the 2nd Red Banner Army entered the Kalochzhan and Lyunchzhen regions, the 15th Army entered the Sansin region, and the 5th Rifle Corps entered the Boli region. The Japanese armies failed to offer significant resistance in these regions, and by August 20, they began to surrender and move into Soviet captivity.

On August 11, elements of the 16th Army began an offensive in Southern Sakhalin and by August 18 they had captured most of the island. From August 19 to 25 the front conducted amphibious assault operations near the port of Kholmsk, and combined amphibious and airborne assault operations near the port of Korsakov. By August 25, Soviet forces had captured the administrative centre of Sakhalin, Yuzhno-Sakhalinsk. By early September, Japanese forces ended their resistance, but due to slow Soviet advances on Sakhalin, the planned operation on the Japanese island of Hokkaidō was never carried out.

Meanwhile, an operational group composed of the 101st Rifle Division captured the Kurile Islands.

On 1 October 1945, by a directive of the Stavka VGK dated 10 September 1945, the Front was disbanded and reorganised as the Far Eastern Military District (2nd Formation).

== Composition August 1945 ==
The 2nd Far Eastern Front included the following units on 9 August 1945:

- 2nd Red Banner Army
- 5th Rifle Corps
- 15th Army
- 16th Army
- 10th Air Army
- Kamchatka Defensive Region
  - 101st Rifle Division
  - 198th Rifle Regiment
  - 5th, 7th Rifle Battalions
- Amur Military Flotilla
- North Pacific Military Flotilla

== See also ==
- Soviet Far East Front
