= Maksim Purkayev =

Soviet general

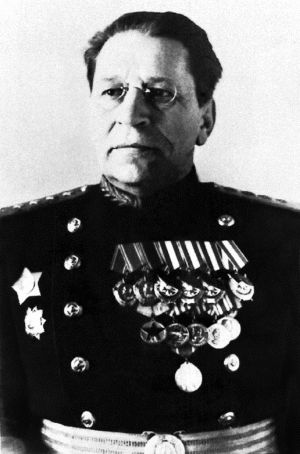
- Born: 26 August [O.S. 14 August] 1894; Nalitovo, Alatyrsky Uyezd, Simbirsk Governorate, Russian Empire
- Died: 1 January 1953 (aged 58); Moscow, Russian SFSR, Soviet Union
- Burial place: Novodevichy Cemetery
- Military career
- Allegiance: Russian Empire; Soviet Union
- Branch: Imperial Russian Army; Red Army (later Soviet Army)
- Service years: 1915–1917; 1918–1953
- Rank: Army general
- Commands: 60th Army (became 3rd Shock Army); Kalinin Front; Far Eastern Front; 2nd Far Eastern Front; Far Eastern Military District
- Conflicts: World War I; Russian Civil War; World War II; Battle of Brody; Battle for Velikiye Luki; Toropets–Kholm Offensive; Soviet–Japanese War; Invasion of South Sakhalin; Soviet assault on Maoka
- Awards: Order of Lenin (2); Order of the Red Banner (4); Order of Suvorov, 1st class; Order of Kutuzov, 1st class

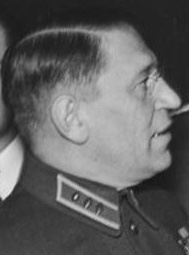

Maksim Alexeyevich Purkayev (Russian: Максим Алексеевич Пуркаев; 26 August [O.S. 14 August] 1894 – January 1, 1953) was a Soviet military leader, reaching the service rank of Army General.

== Biography ==
Purkayev was conscripted into the Imperial Russian Army in 1915, and reached the rank of praporshchik before joining the Red Army in 1918. He became a member of the Communist Party in 1919. During the Russian Civil War he served in the capacity of a company and battalion commander, and after completing the Vystrel officer training course in 1923, he served as a regimental commander (24th Rifle Division), staff officer and commander of a division until 1936 when he commenced studies at the Frunze Military Academy.

From 1938 Purkayev served as the Chief of Staff of the Belorussian Military District, as the Soviet military attaché in Berlin at the start of the Second World War in 1939, and participated in planning of the Soviet invasion of Poland. From July 1940, Purkayev served as the Chief of Staff of the Kiev Special Military District, and from the start of the Soviet-German War, serving as the Chief of Staff of the Southwestern Front (June–July 1941), and later of the 60th Army and 3rd Shock Army. In 1942–43 he served as commander of the Kalinin Front and from April 1943, the Far Eastern Front (from 1945, 2nd Far Eastern Front). From September 1945 to January 1947 Purkayev served as the commanding officer of the Far Eastern Military District during which time he was nominated to the Supreme Soviet of the USSR (1946–1950).

From June 1947, Purkayev was the Chief of Staff and 1st Deputy Commander-in-Chief of the Far Eastern Forces. From July 1952 to his death Purkayev served as the Chief of the Higher Education Directorate of the Ministry of Defence of USSR.

== Honours and awards ==
Maksim Purkayev was decorated with two Orders of Lenin (incl. 14 November 1943; "For exemplary fulfillment of the leadership of the Red Army mobilization, formation, acquisition and training of units and formations"), four Orders of the Red Banner, Order of Suvorov (1st class), Order of Kutuzov (1st class), and numerous medals.

== Sources ==
- Zalessky, K.A., Stalin's Empire: Biographical encyclopaedic dictionary, Moscow, Veche, 2000, (Russian: Залесский К.А. Империя Сталина. Биографический энциклопедический словарь. Москва, Вече, 2000)
