= Northern Pacific Flotilla =

Soviet Navy fleet

- Active: August 1939–September 1945
- Country: Soviet Union
- Branch: Soviet Navy
- Type: Flotilla
- Part of: Pacific Fleet
- Garrison/HQ: Sovetskaya Gavan
- Engagements: Soviet–Japanese War

The Northern Pacific Flotilla (Russian: Северная Тихоокеанская военная флотилия) was a flotilla of the Pacific Fleet of the Soviet Navy between 1939 and 1945, with its main base at Sovetskaya Gavan in the Soviet Far East.

It defended the Strait of Tartary and the Sea of Okhotsk during World War II, and participated in the Invasion of South Sakhalin and the Invasion of the Kuril Islands during the Soviet–Japanese War in August and September 1945; it was disbanded shortly after the end of the war.

== History ==
The flotilla was established as part of the Pacific Fleet in August 1939 to guard coastal and maritime communications in the Strait of Tartary and the Sea of Okhotsk, with its main base at Sovetskaya Gavan, under the command of Counter Admiral Mikhail Arapov. The flotilla laid minefields off Sovetskaya Gavan during World War II. In February 1943 Arapov was replaced by Counter Admiral Vladimir Andreyev, who was promoted to vice admiral on 5 November 1944.

By the beginning of the Soviet–Japanese War in August 1945, the flotilla included two patrol ships, eighteen trawlers, fifteen Shchuka-class and M-class submarines, 43 motor torpedo boats, seven large guard and patrol ships, as well as fifty patrol boats, two monitors, four minesweepers, two minelayers, the 365th Separate Naval Infantry Battalion, and 280 aircraft of Soviet Naval Aviation. Submarines and motor torpedo boats were organized into the 3rd Submarine Brigade and the 5th, 8th, and 9th Motor Torpedo Divisions. Two additional naval bases at De-Kastri and Nikolayevsk-on-Amur were part of the fleet, along with the Sovetskaya Gavan and Kamchatka Fortified (Defensive) Districts and the Nagaev Fortified Sector.

Subordinated to the 2nd Far Eastern Front for the war, the flotilla laid minefields in the Strait of Tartary and the Sakhalin Gulf beginning on the evening of 8 August in order to prevent Japanese retaliation. It was to capture South Sakhalin in cooperation with the 56th Rifle Corps of the 16th Army. It was tasked with supporting an amphibious landing by the 365th Battalion and the 113th Rifle Brigade at the ports of Toro and Maoka, departing from Sovetskaya Gavan. Andreyev began the attack on the morning of 16 August by landing a 1,500-strong force of the 365th Battalion and the 2nd Battalion of the 113th Brigade at Toro, supported by seventeen warships and five transports. The attack captured the port and forced the retreat of three Japanese companies from it and nearby Esutoru. This was followed by the 20 August landing of 3,400 men from the remainder of the 113th Brigade and a battalion of sailors at Maoka, which speedily defeated the Japanese defenders.

The flotilla subsequently participated in the Invasion of the Kuril Islands and the Sungari Offensive during the Soviet–Japanese War, providing transport and launching air strikes on Japanese bases and ports. After the end of the war, it was disbanded in September.
