= Shakhtyorsk =

Town in Sakhalin Oblast, Russia

Shakhtyorsk Шахтёрск
- Town
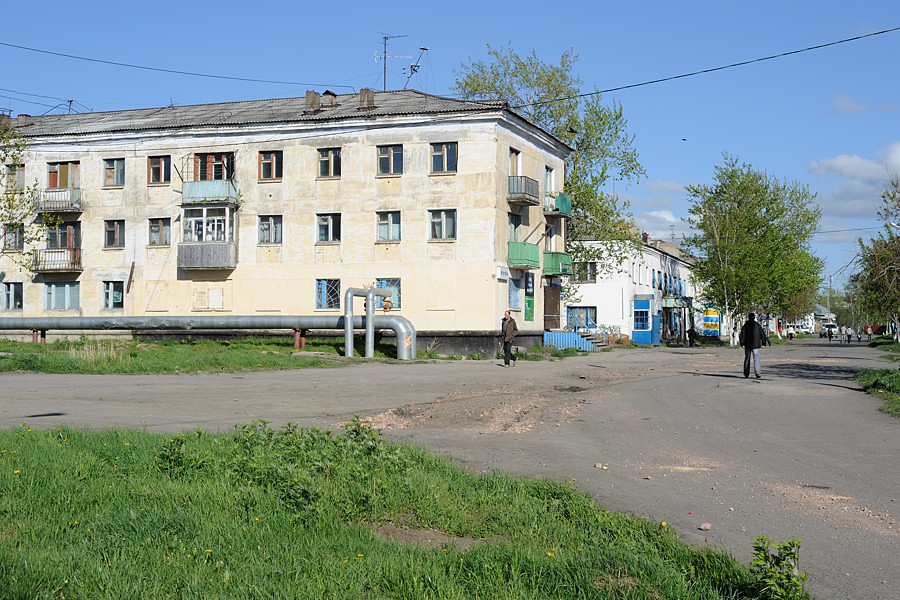
- Central Shakhtyorsk

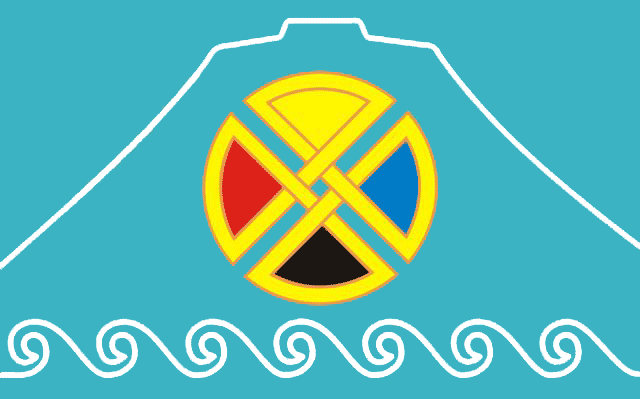
- Flag
- Interactive map of Shakhtyorsk
- Location of Shakhtyorsk Shakhtyorsk (Sakhalin Oblast)
- Coordinates: 49°09′32″N 142°06′25″E
- Country: Russia
- Federal subject: Sakhalin Oblast
- Administrative district: Uglegorsky District
- Town of district significanceSelsoviet: Shakhtyorsk
- Founded: after 1905
- Town status since: 1947
- Elevation: 30 m (98 ft)

Population (2010 Census)
  - Total: 8,382
  - Estimate (2023): 6,572 (−21.6%)

Administrative status
  - Capital of: town of district significance of Shakhtyorsk

Municipal status
  - Municipal district: Uglegorsky Municipal District
  - Urban settlement: Shakhtyorskoye Urban Settlement
  - Capital of: Shakhtyorskoye Urban Settlement
- Time zone: UTC+11 (MSK+8)
- Postal code: 694910
- Dialing code: +7 42432
- OKTMO ID: 64652110001

Shakhtyorsk (Russian: Шахтёрск; Japanese: 塔路, Tōro) is a town in Uglegorsky District of Sakhalin Oblast, Russia, located on the western coast of the Sakhalin Island, 376 kilometers (234 mi) northwest of Yuzhno-Sakhalinsk, the administrative center of the oblast. Population: 8,382 (2010 census); 10,643 (2002 census); 12,945 (1989 Soviet census).

== Etymology ==
The name of the town derives from the Russian word "шахтёр" ("miner"), referring to the black coal production in the surrounding area.

== History ==
It was founded after 1905 as Tōro, in the region then known as the Karafuto Prefecture of Japan. After the Soviet Union gained control over the southern part of the Sakhalin Island in August 1945, it became part of Sakhalin Oblast. It was granted town status and given its present name in 1947.

== Administrative and municipal status ==
Within the framework of administrative divisions, it is, together with four rural localities, incorporated within Uglegorsky District as the town of district significance of Shakhtyorsk. As a municipal division, the town of district significance of Shakhtyorsk is incorporated within Uglegorsky Municipal District as Shakhtyorskoye Urban Settlement.

== Economy ==
The town's economy relies mainly on black coal mining, which supports a power station.

== Notable people ==
- Yuri Aleksandrovich Yakimov (born 28 February 1953, Shakhtyorsk) is a Russian rower who competed for the Soviet Union in the 1976 Summer Olympics. Нe won the silver medal in the quadruple sculls event.
