= Kholmsk =

Town in Sakhalin Oblast, Russia

Kholmsk Холмск
- Town
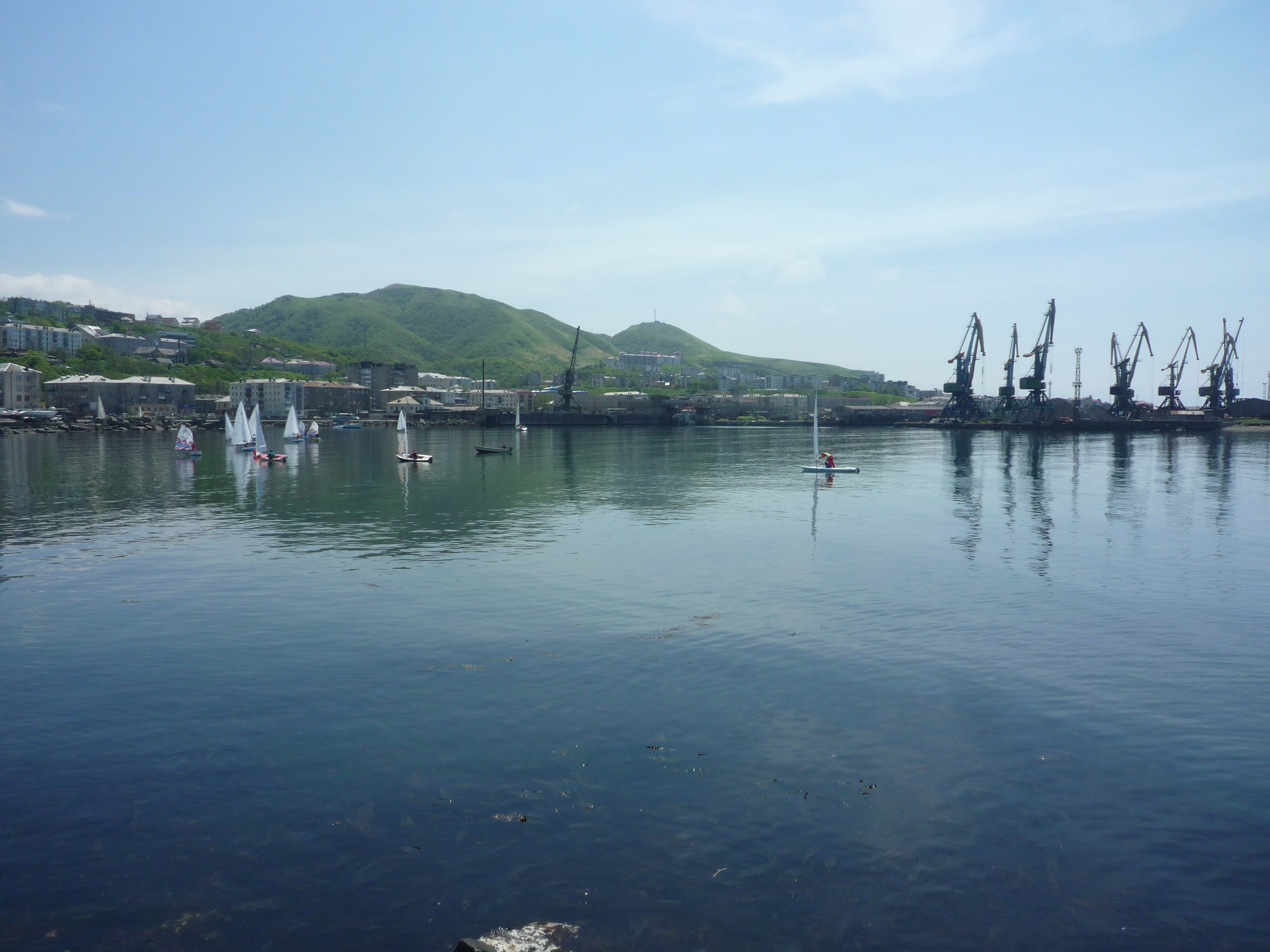
- Kholmsk Commercial Port

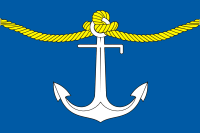
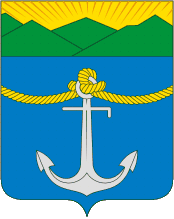
- Flag Coat of arms
- Interactive map of Kholmsk
- Location of Kholmsk Kholmsk (Sakhalin Oblast)
- Coordinates: 47°03′N 142°03′E
- Country: Russia
- Federal subject: Sakhalin Oblast
- Administrative district: Kholmsky District
- Founded: 1870
- Elevation: 10 m (33 ft)

Population (2010 Census)
  - Total: 30,937
  - Estimate (1 January 2024): 24,884 (−19.6%)

Administrative status
  - Capital of: Kholmsky District

Municipal status
  - Urban okrug: Kholmsky Urban Okrug
  - Capital of: Kholmsky Urban Okrug
- Time zone: UTC+11 (MSK+8)
- Postal code: 694620
- Dialing code: +7 42433
- OKTMO ID: 64754000001
- Town Day: the third Saturday of August
- Website: admkholmsk.ru

Kholmsk (Russian: Холмск), known until 1946 as Maoka (Japanese: 真岡), is a port town and the administrative center of Kholmsky District of Sakhalin Oblast, Russia. It is located on the southwest coast of the Sakhalin Island, on coast of the gulf of Nevelsky in the Strait of Tartary of the Sea of Japan, 83 kilometers (52 mi) west of Yuzhno-Sakhalinsk. Population: 30,937 (2010 census); 35,141 (2002 census); 51,381 (1989 Soviet census).

== History ==
It was founded in 1870 as a military post for the Russian Army. After the Russo-Japanese War of 1904–1905, it was transferred to Japanese control, along with the rest of southern Sakhalin, under the Treaty of Portsmouth. The Japanese renamed it Maoka (真岡), it is said to mean "quiet place" in Ainu language.

On August 20, 1945, a combined marine battalion and the 113th infantry brigade landed in Port Maoka. They were preceded by a group of scouts, landed secretively by submarine Sh-118, in the Maoka area to successfully complete their task. However, Japanese resistance was desperate, and the landing party had to fight particularly fiercely. Japanese fire set one of the coastguard vessels on fire, to which the Russian response was intense naval bombardment of the town, causing more civilian deaths. See Soviet assault on Maoka for details.

The Red Army retook the whole of Sakhalin at the end of World War II, with the town receiving its present name in 1946. The name is derived from the Russian word Kholm for hill, referring to the town's location on the hillside surrounding the harbor.

As with a number of urban areas in the Russian Far East, Kholmsk has seen a large drop in population since the dissolution of the Soviet Union and the economic crisis which followed in the 1990s.

== Administrative and municipal status ==
Within the framework of administrative divisions, Kholmsk serves as the administrative center of Kholmsky District and is subordinated to it. As a municipal division, the town of Kholmsk and twenty-three rural localities of Kholmsky District are incorporated as Kholmsky Urban Okrug.

=== Authorities ===
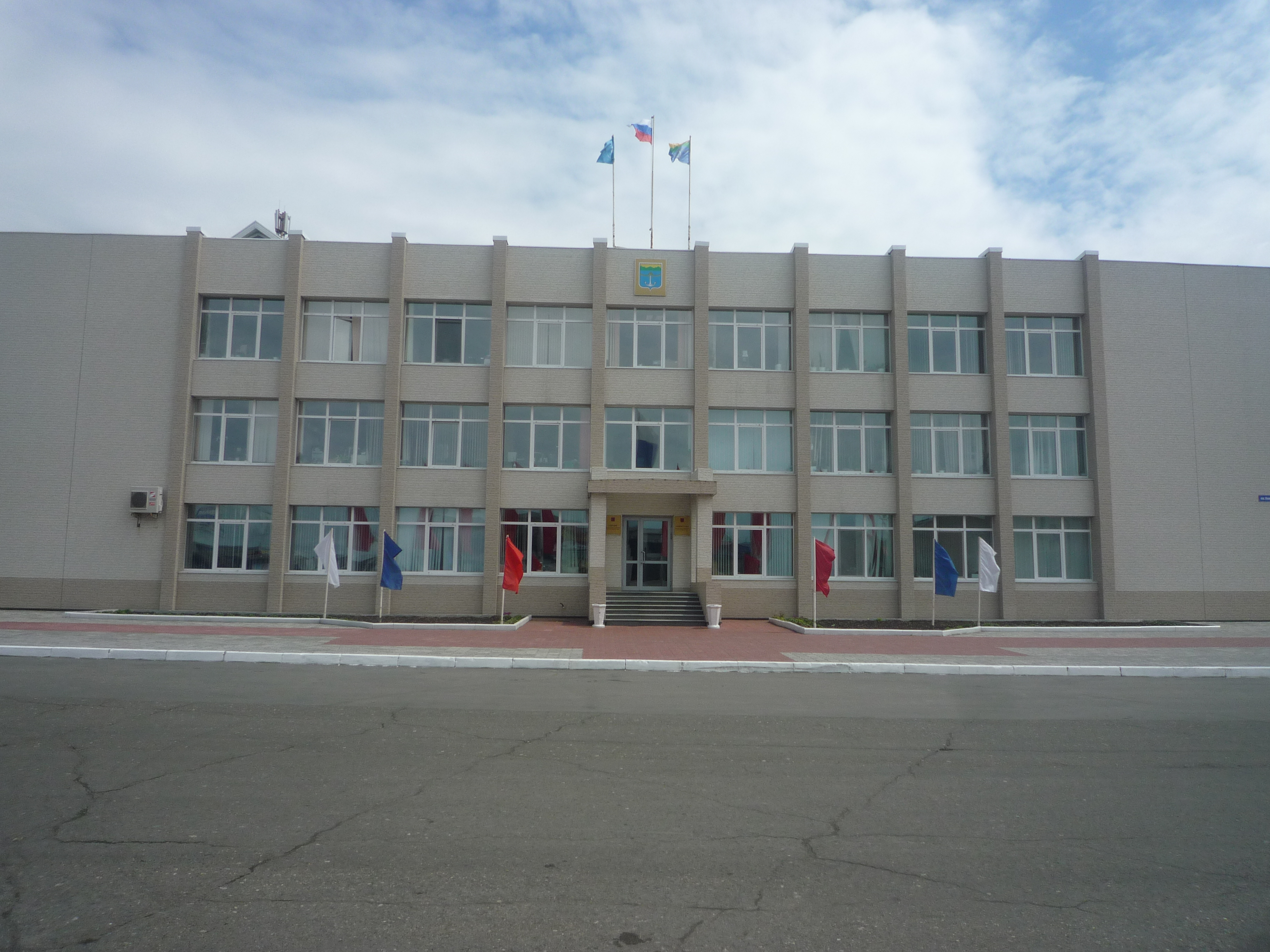
Administration of Kholmsky urban district

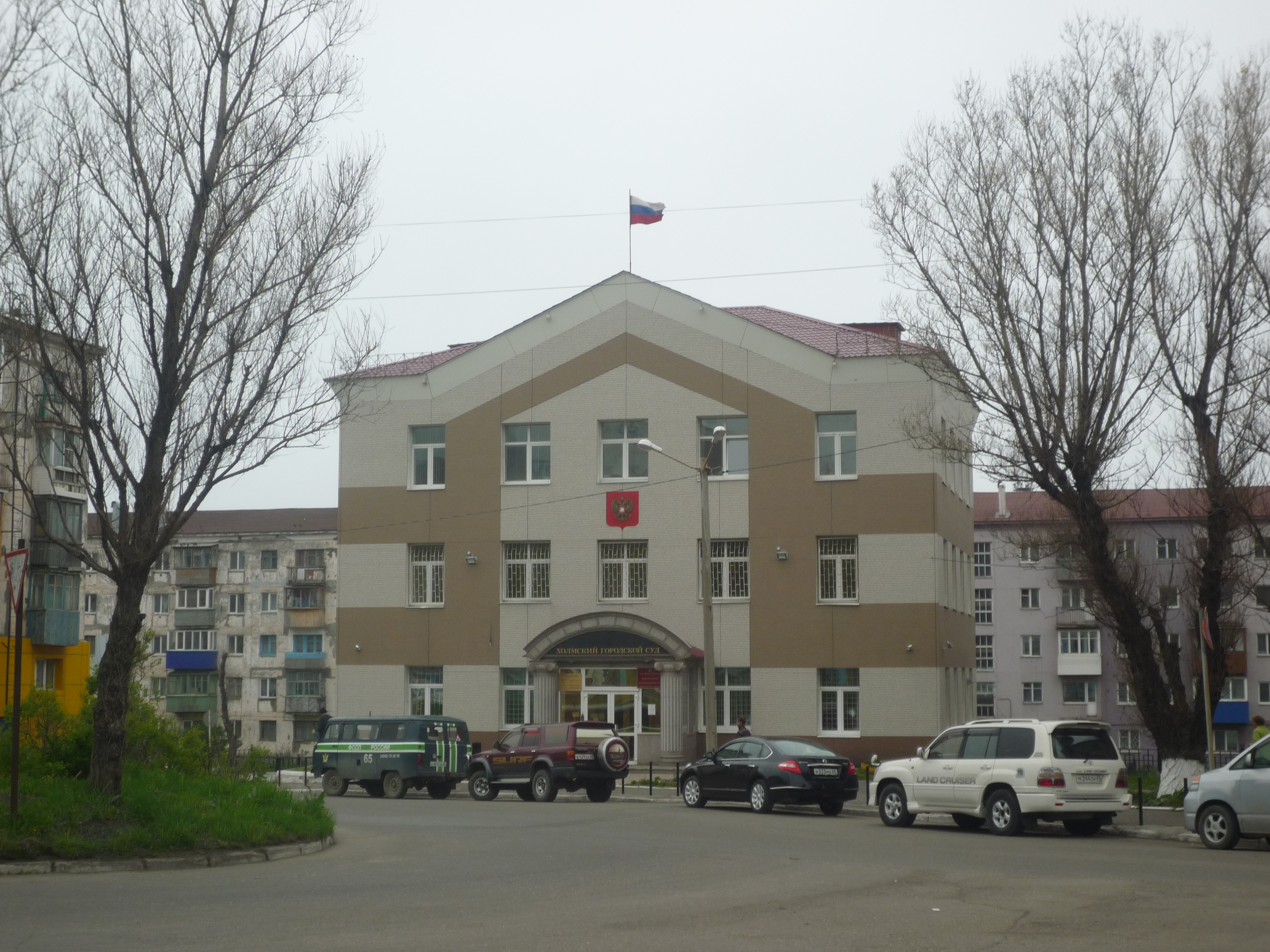
Kholm City Court

Local self-government in Kholmsk, as in other municipalities, is built on the principles of respect for the rights and freedoms of man and citizen, state guarantees of the rule of law, transparency, independence in resolving issues of local importance, election of bodies and officials, and their responsibility to the city population and state authorities in terms of the execution of certain state powers delegated to local self-government.

The structure of municipal self-government bodies includes:

- The mayor of the city and urban district, an elected senior official;
- The city Assembly of Deputies, a representative body;
- The administration of the municipality, the executive body.

The city assembly is elected by the district's population once every four years. The meeting is headed by a chairman elected at the first meeting. The current fourth convocation of the Assembly consists of 20 deputies: 9 from United Russia, 9 from the Communist Party of the Russian Federation, and 2 from the Liberal Democratic Party. The head of the administration is appointed under a contract concluded based on the results of a competition to fill the position for the term of office of the Assembly.

Law enforcement functions are carried out by the Department of Internal Affairs, the city court, and the city prosecutor's office. There are also federal, regional, and municipal management and control structures in the city: migration service, tax service, bailiff service, FSB department, fisheries inspection (Rosselkhoznadzor), territorial election commission, registry office, education department, employment center, social security department, military registration and enlistment office, pension fund, traffic police, private fire protection. The Russian Maritime Register of Shipping, customs, and a border post are located here.

Mayors of the city of Kholmsk and the Kholmsk urban district:

- 1991-1994 - Nikolai Petrovich Dolgikh
- 1994-1997 - Arkady Vyacheslavovich Kukin
- 1997-2001 - Nikolai Petrovich Dolgikh
- 2001-2005 — Alexander Petrovich Gusto
- 2005-2007 — Alexey Veniaminovich Vybornov
- 2007-2011 — Alexander Petrovich Gusto
- 2011-2015 — Oleg Petrovich Nazarenko
- 2015-2018 — Andrey Modestovich Sukhomesov
- c 20.12.2018 — Alexey Anatolyevich Letechin
- c 2019 — Dmitry Henrikhovich Lyubchinov

== Economy and transport ==
Kholmsk is an important seaport for Sakhalin Island. Since 1973, it has been the Sakhalin terminal of the Vanino-Kholmsk train ferry to the port of Vanino on the Russian mainland, connecting the mainline rail network with that of the island.

Until 2019, Sakhalin railways continued to use the Japanese gauge of 1,067 mm (3 ft 6 in), which required railcars coming from the Russian mainland to have their bogies changed in Kholmsk. The island's narrow gauge railway network underwent conversion to Russian broad gauge in August 2019.

It is the largest transport hub on Sakhalin, which includes an ice-free seaport with 2 terminals, 3 railway stations and a knot of highways. Kholmsk is connected with Vanino port by the Kholmsk—Vanino sea railway passenger-and-freight ferry. From the town, the federal highway R495 Kholmsk—Yuzhno-Sakhalinsk begins. Kholmsk is a large economic, industrial and cultural center of the Sakhalin Oblast, a center of sea fishery and ship repair.

== Twin towns and sister cities ==
Kholmsk is twinned with:

- Ansan, South Korea
- Otaru, Japan
- Kushiro, Japan (since 1975)
