= Hubert Vos =

Dutch painter (1855–1935)

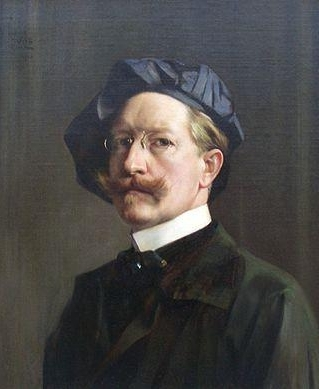
Self-portrait of Hubert Vos in 1922

Hubert Vos (February 15, 1855 – January 8, 1935) was a Dutch painter who was born Josephus Hubertus Vos in Maastricht. He studied at the Académie Royale des Beaux-Arts in Brussels and with Fernand Cormon in Paris. He exhibited widely in Paris, Amsterdam, Brussels, Dresden, and Munich. From 1885 to 1892, he worked in England, where he exhibited at the Royal Academy between 1888 and 1891. He was a member of the Royal Society of British Artists.

== Career ==
In 1877, Vos married Aline Watteau, family of the famous French rococo painter Antoine Watteau. They had two children: a daughter, Isolde (1881–1950), and a son, Marius (1883–1974). His second wife was Eleanor Kaikilani Coney, of Hawaiian, Chinese, and American descent. They married in 1897 and had a daughter, Margueritte. In 1898, Vos visited Hawaii, where he painted the local people. The same year, he traveled to Korea, where he completed at least three paintings in duplicate. In each case, he left one copy in Korea and kept one copy. The paintings are a life-sized portrait of Emperor Gojong, a portrait of Min Sang-ho, and a landscape of Seoul. The copies left in Korea hung in the Deoksugung Palace until all except the landscape were destroyed by fire in 1904. Vos visited China in 1899 and painted portraits of prominent leaders. Empress Dowager Cixi (Tzu Hsi), whose portrait had been painted in oil by the American artist Katharine Carl, saw his portraits and invited Vos to visit China in 1905. He did one portrait of her, which is still displayed in the Summer Palace, then finished another back in New York. This was displayed at the Paris Salon, then acquired by Grenville L. Winthrop and given to the Fogg Museum at Harvard.

In addition to portraits and landscapes, Vos is known for his interior scenes and still-life paintings of Chinese porcelains. The gifts from Empress Dowager Cixi are favorite objects of his still-life paintings. He died in New York City in 1935.

The Louvre Museum (Paris, France), Bonnefanten Museum (Maastricht, Netherlands), Chicago History Museum, Fogg Art Museum (Harvard University), Honolulu Museum of Art, Luxembourg Palace (Paris), Metropolitan Museum of Art, Capital Museum (Beijing), and the Smithsonian American Art Museum are among the public collections holding Vos's work. In 1895, Vos was elected to The Lambs theatrical club. Three of his portraits are displayed in the club collection in Manhattan.

== Selected works ==
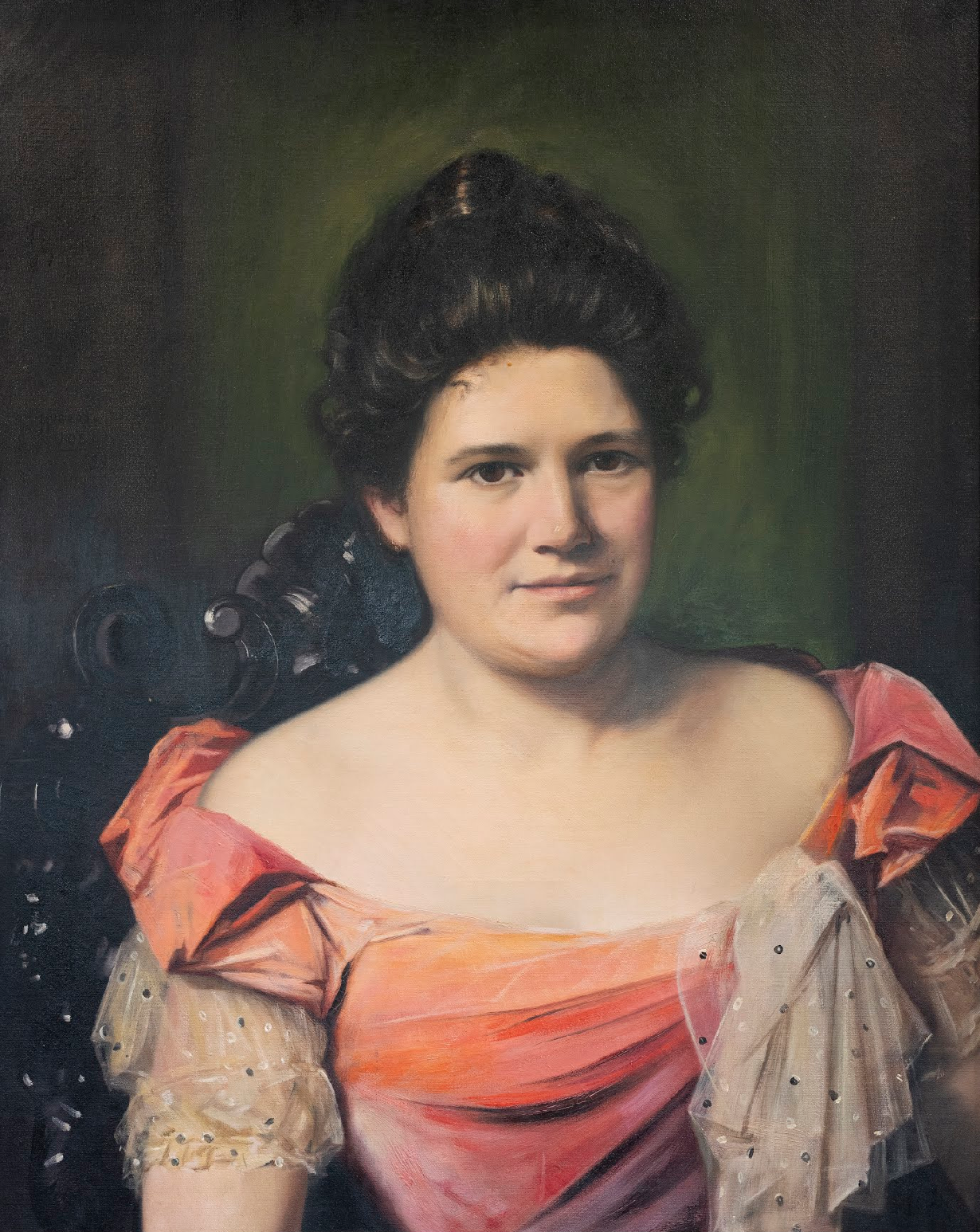
Camilla Loyall Ashe Sewall c. 1897, Maine Maritime Museum

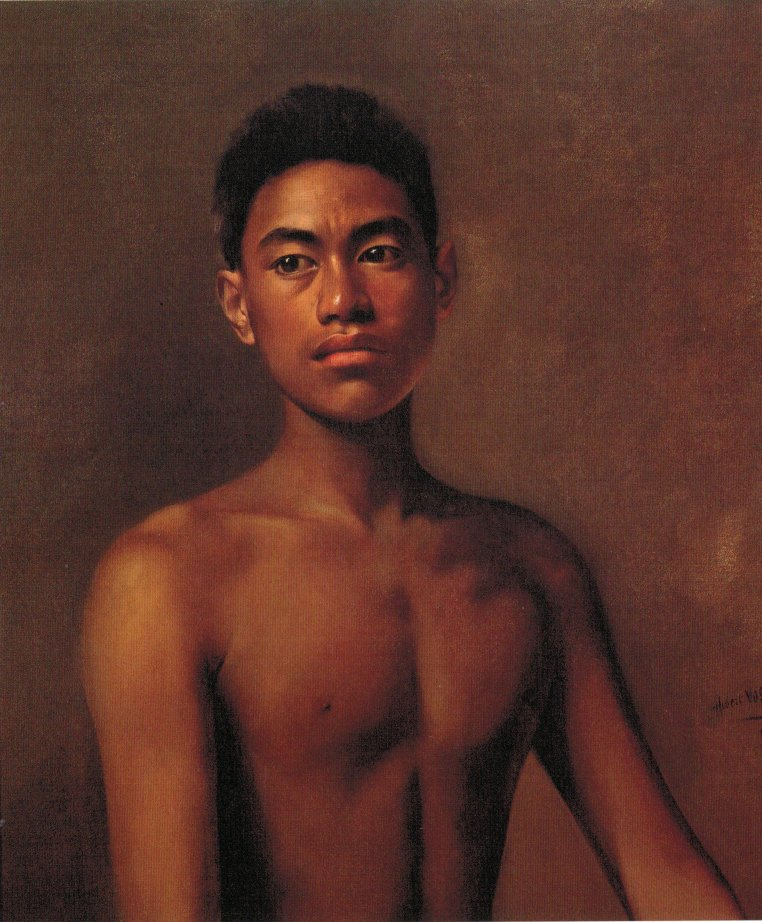
Iokepa, Hawaiian Fisher Boy, 1898

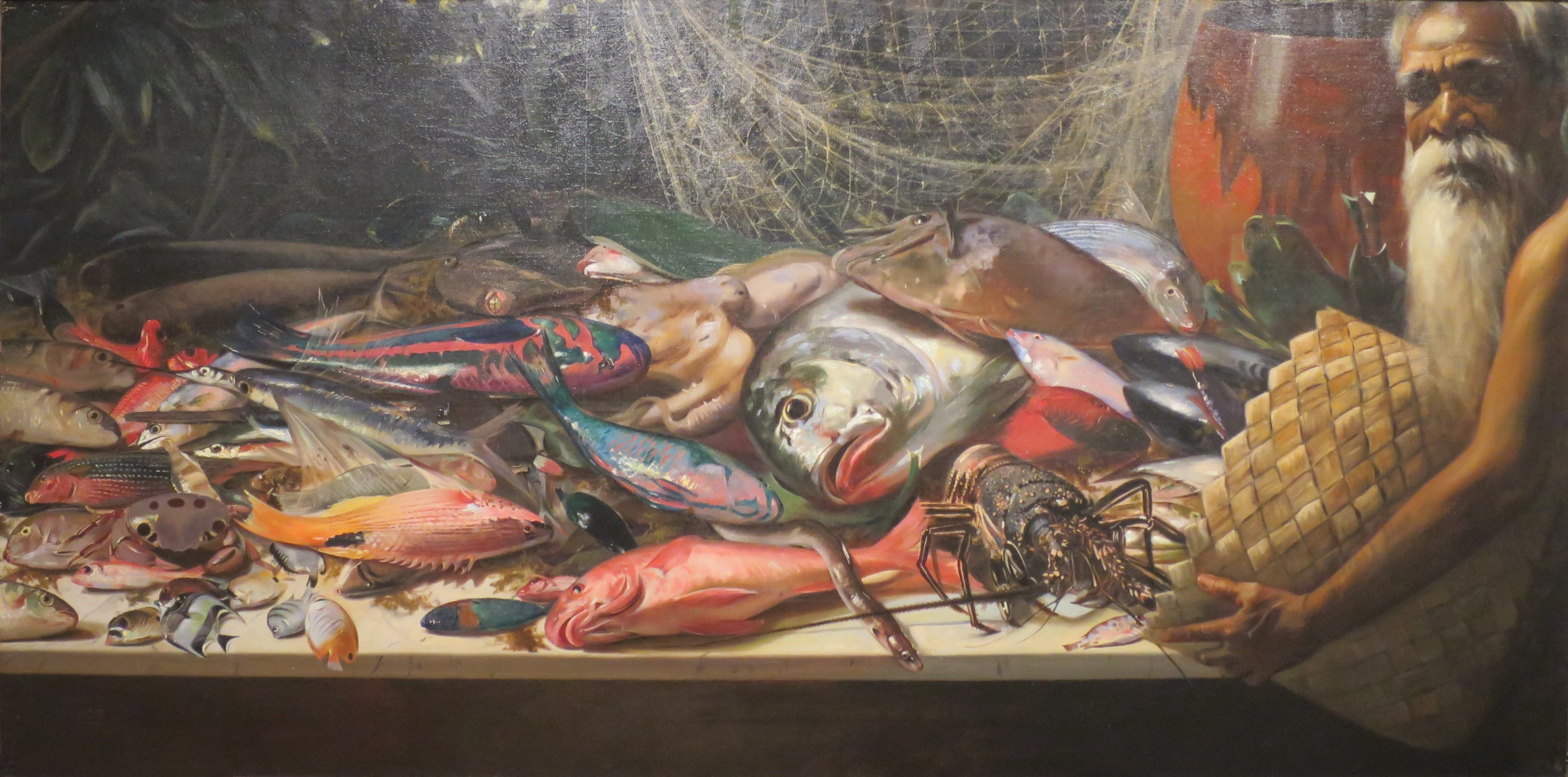
Study of Hawaiian Fish, 1898, Honolulu Museum of Art

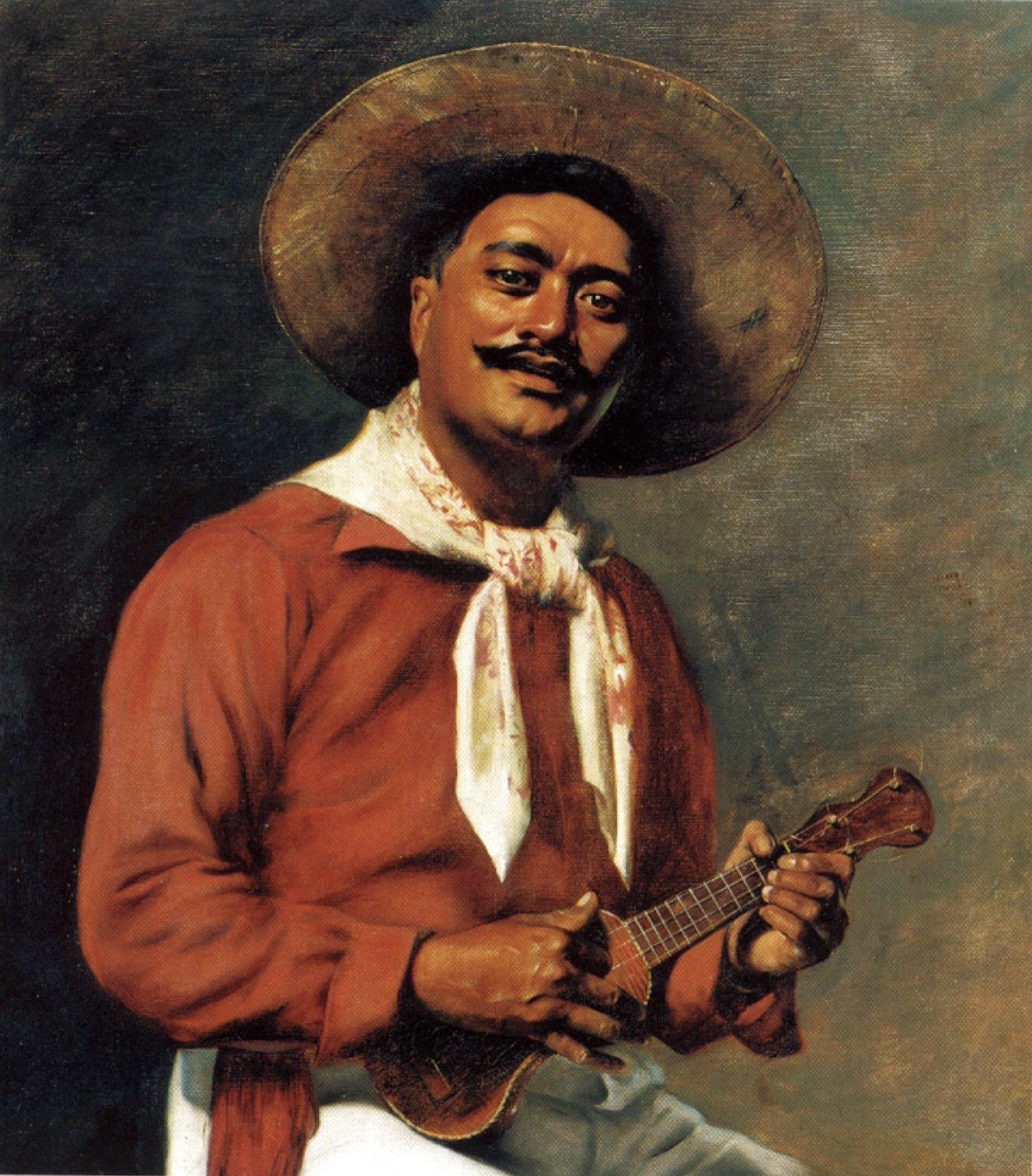
Hawaiian Troubadour, 1898, Honolulu Museum of Art

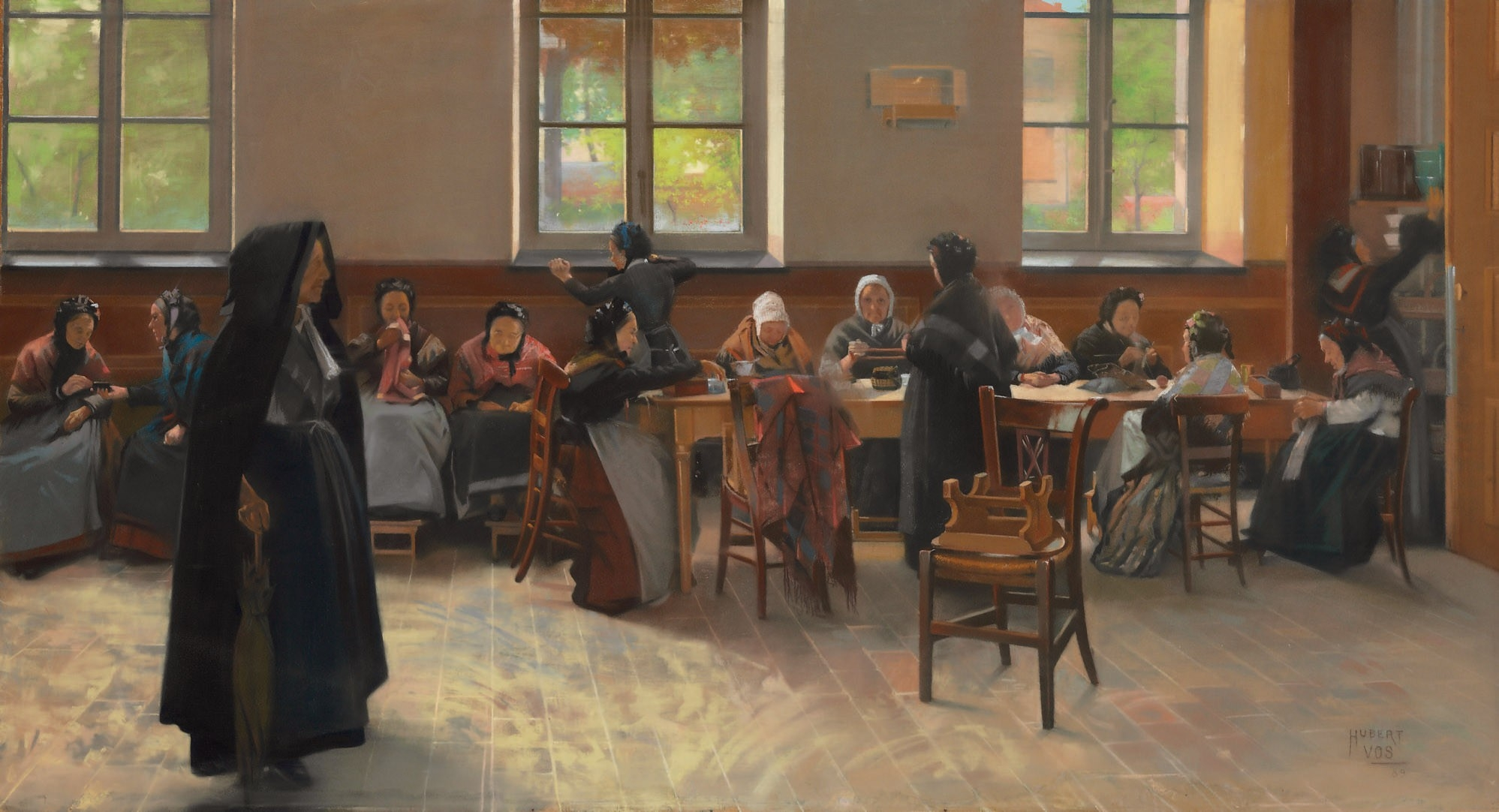
The Knitting Room (1889)

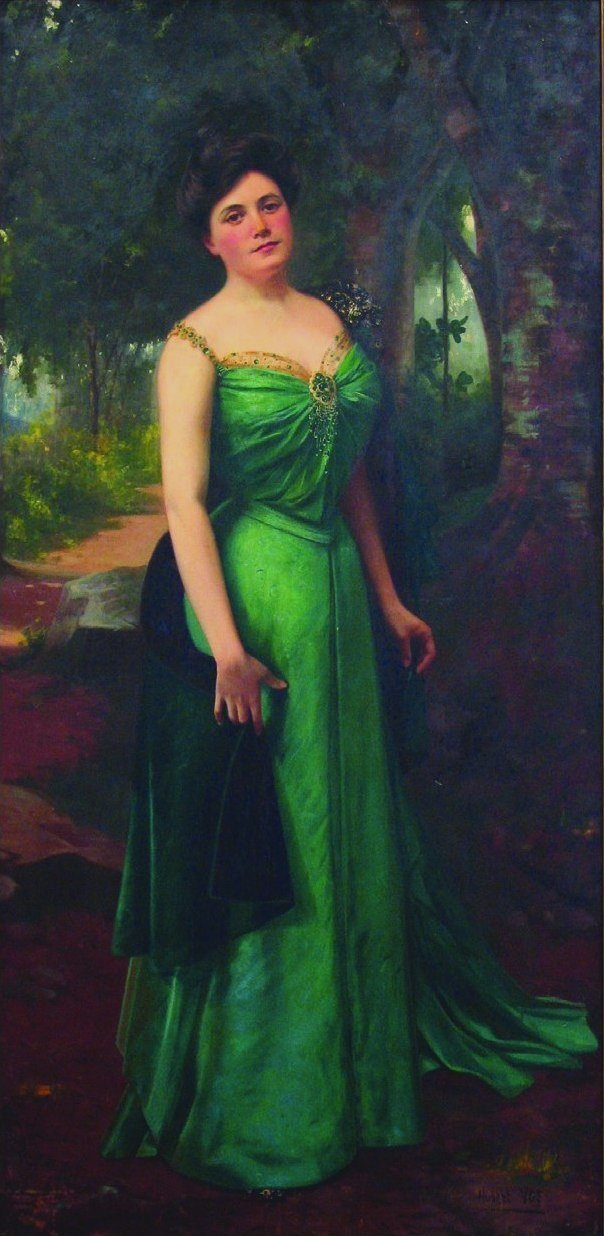
Kaikilani, 1900

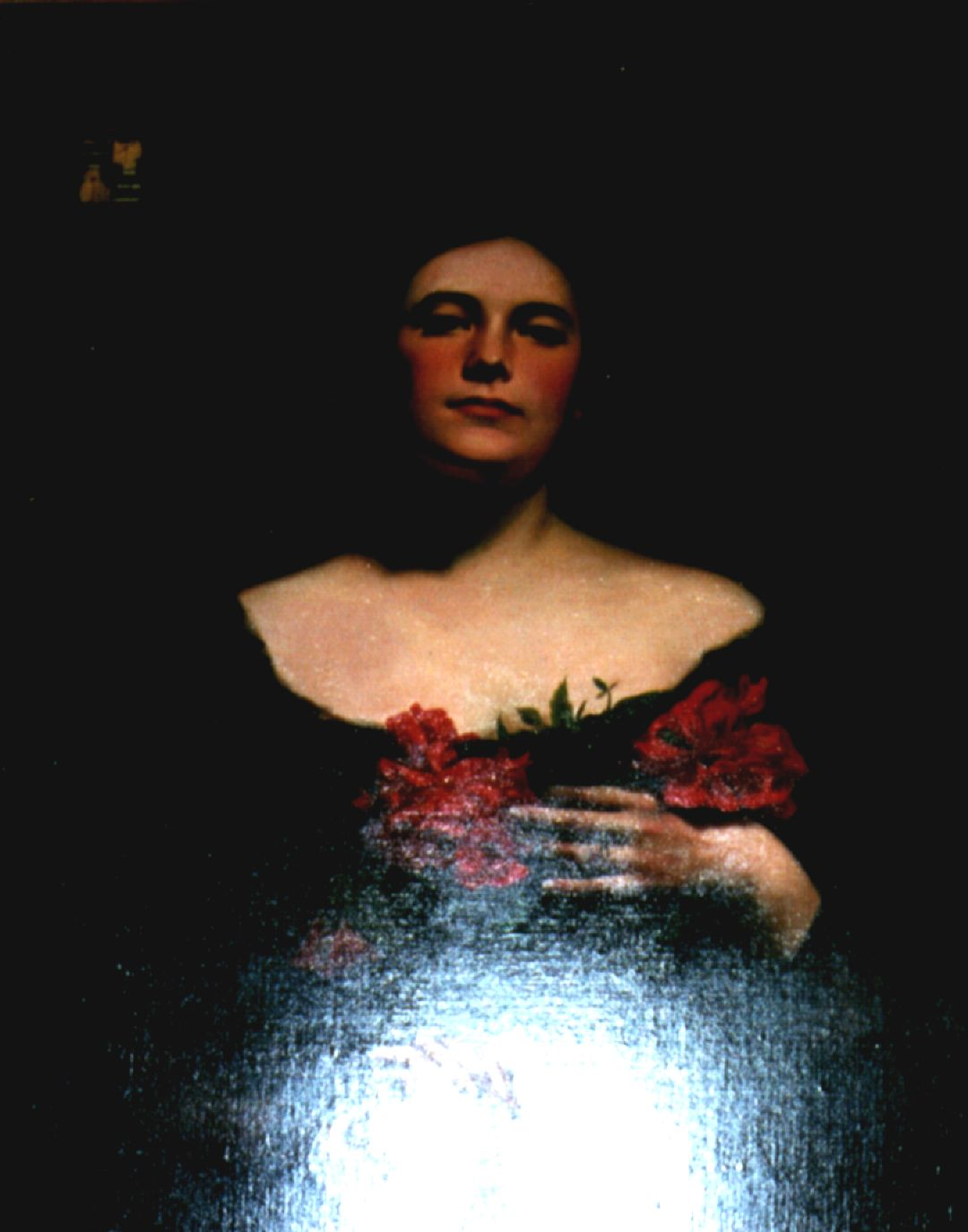
Kaikilani, undated

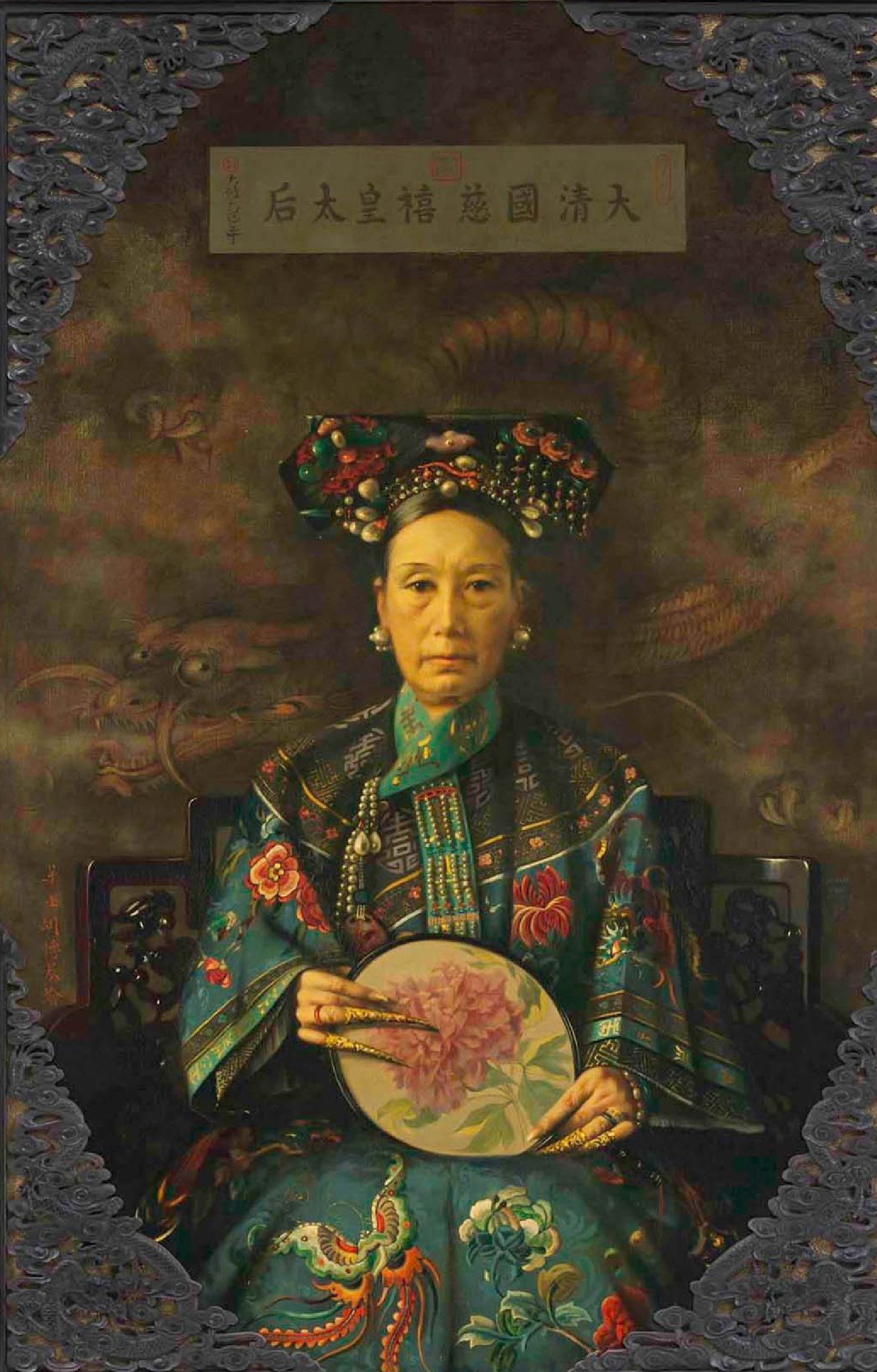
Empress Dowager Cixi of China,1905

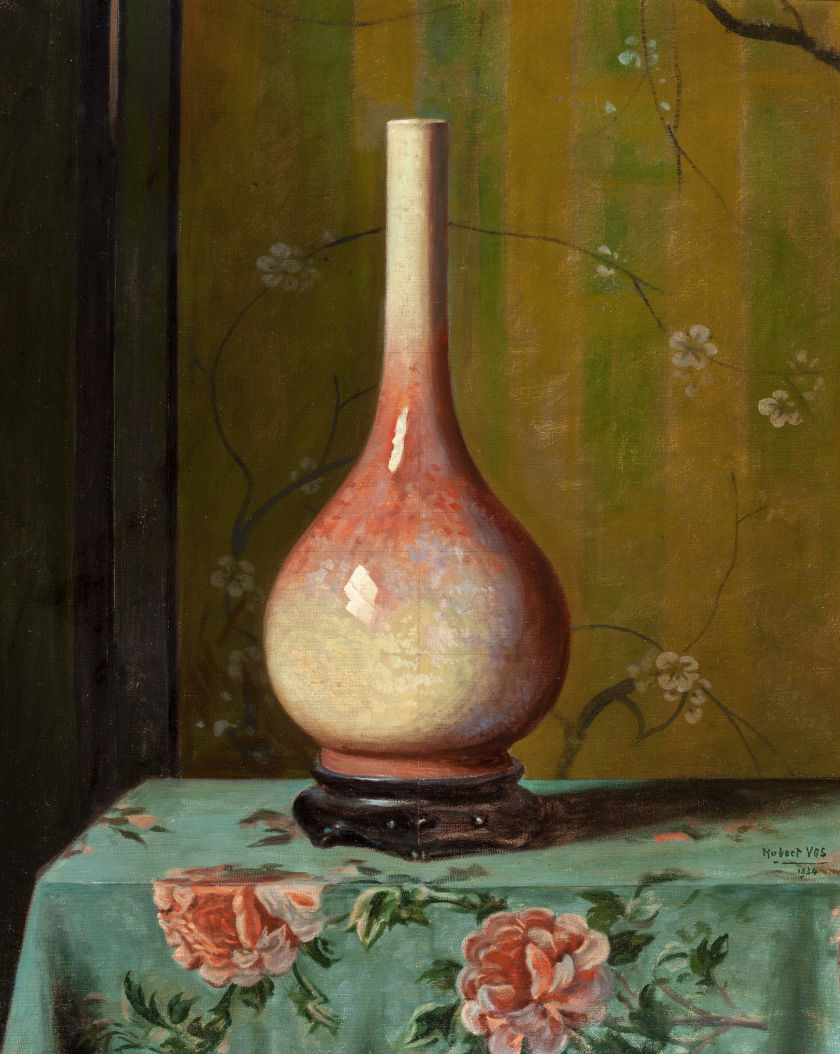
Pink and Green Vase (1935)
