= 2nd Tank Division (Imperial Japanese Army) =

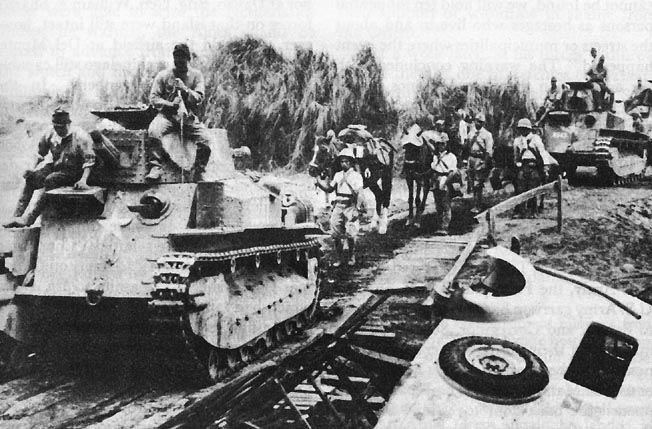
- Japanese tanks moving toward Manila
- Active: 1942–1945
- Country: Empire of Japan
- Branch: Imperial Japanese Army
- Type: Armored division
- Garrison/HQ: Tokyo, Japan
- Nickname: 撃 = Geki (Attack)
- Engagements: Second Sino-Japanese War; Second World War; Pacific War; Invasion of Lingayen Gulf; Philippines campaign; Battle of Luzon

The 2nd Tank Division (戦車第2師団, Sensha Dai-ni Shidan) was one of four armored divisions of the Imperial Japanese Army in World War II.

== History ==
The 2nd Tank Division was raised in Manchukuo on June 24, 1942. Stationed in Mudanjiang in northeastern Manchukuo, it was tasked primarily with border patrol of Manchukuo's eastern frontier with the Soviet Union under the overall command of the Japanese First Area Army.

In February 1944, the 11th Tank Regiment was sent to the Kuriles. In the following month, the Recon Unit was renamed the 27th Tank Regiment and with the AA unit, sent to China. As the situation in the Pacific War against the Allies deteriorated for Japan, in early August 1944 the remaining units of the 2nd Tank Division were reassigned to the Japanese Fourteenth Area Army, and sent to the Philippines, where it was deployed on the main island of Luzon.

In January 1945, the US forces made amphibious landings on Luzon and the army units pushed inland. General Tomoyuki Yamashita held back the tank division so as not to waste them in large scale counterattacks against superior forces. He had them withdraw inland to northern defensive positions. During this time, the 2nd Tank Division came under heavy air attacks. Most of the 2nd Tank Division, dug in around San Jose. It lost 108 of its 220 tanks in heavy fighting in just over a week. By March 5, the division had lost a total of 203 Type 97 Chi-Ha and 19 Type 95 Ha-Go tanks, and two of its new Type 4 Ho-Ro self-propelled guns. The remaining tanks were used to support infantry or were dug in like pillboxes and annihilated during the remainder of the Battle of the Philippines in various engagements on Luzon, Leyte and Mindanao.

The 2nd Tank Division was reconstituted in Japan as a training unit after the disaster in the Philippines. In February 1945, its 11th Armored Regiment was transferred to the control of the Japanese Fifth Area Army and attached to the 91st Infantry Division. It was stationed in the northern Kuril Islands, where it was in combat against the Soviet Red Army at Paramushir during Invasion of the Kuril Islands at the end of World War II. It was officially demobilized in September 1945 with the rest of the Imperial Japanese Army. Also, the reconnaissance regiment was transferred to Okinawa where it was converted to the 27th armored regiment attached to the 24th Division, and finally anti-aircraft company was transferred to 20th Army.

== Commanding officer ==
	Name	From	To
1	Lieutenant General Tasuku Okada	20 September 1942	7 December 1943
2	Lieutenant General Yoshiharu Iwanaka	27 December 1943	30 September 1945

== See also ==
- List of Japanese armored divisions
