= 43rd Division (Imperial Japanese Army) =

- Active: 1943 - 1944
- Country: Empire of Japan
- Branch: Imperial Japanese Army
- Type: Infantry
- Size: 13039
- Garrison/HQ: Nagoya
- Nickname: Honor Division
- Engagements: Battle of Saipan

Commanders
- Notable commanders: Prince Kaya Tsunenori; Yoshitsugu Saitō

The 43rd Division (第43師団, Dai-yonjūsan Shidan) was an infantry division of the Imperial Japanese Army. Its call sign was the Honor Division (誉兵団, Homare Heidan).

The Imperial Japanese Army (IJA) 43rd Division was raised as a triangular division (type B, standard) on 10 June 1943 in Nagoya, simultaneously with 42nd, 46th and 47th divisions. The nucleus for the formation was the headquarters of the 3rd division and the 63rd independent infantry brigade. The 43rd division was assigned to the Central District Army upon formation.

In April 1944, the 43rd division was assigned to 31st army and reorganized to a marine (mixed) division, with artillery and engineer regiments absorbed by infantry regiments. Also, Yoshitsugu Saitō was appointed as divisional commander instead of Prince Kaya Tsunenori.

The bulk of the 43rd division left Tateyama, Chiba on 14 May 1944 and reached Saipan uneventfully on 19 May 1944. It was the last successful (8th) of the so-called Pine transport transfers. The 118th infantry regiment was late for the 8th Pine transport, which sailed from Yokohama on 29 May 1944 as convoy 3530, and suffered two-thirds losses from a US submarine attack on 4 June 1944 before arriving in Saipan on 9 June 1944.

About 9000 troops and 13 artillery pieces of the 43rd division then dug in around Mount Tapochau, with the rest spread over the southern part of Saipan island. Overall, the 43rd division managed to add one line of trenches to the pre-existing defences before the arrival of the US invasion fleet on 13 June 1944.

The battle of Saipan began with US landings on 15 June 1944. On 17 June 1944 at 2:30 a.m., a large counter-attack was performed by the 43rd division together with the 9th armored regiment of the 1st tank division. Although the division was able to re-capture the local high ground around Hinashita hill, the Japanese gains were dramatically reversed in the morning of 18 June 1944, when the US forces captured Hinashita hill and an airfield in the south of the island largely intact. By 24 June 1944, the 43rd division was reduced to four battalions of infantry and a half-battalion of artillery.

On 27 June 1944, as the Mount Tapochau defences were failing rapidly, Yoshitsugu Saitō, the 43rd division commander, radioed Tokyo asking for either reinforcements or evacuation by air. At that point, he estimated resistance could continue until 10 July 1944. By 5 July 1944 the position of the 43rd division was hopeless, so Yoshitsugu Saitō ordered to prepare for a suicidal banzai charge, starting at the dawn of 7 July 1944 with a force of 4,000 men, most of them already wounded. The 43rd division was annihilated in this banzai charge, killing 658 US servicemen in its final day.
