= 46th Division (Imperial Japanese Army) =

- Active: 14 May 1943–15 August 1945
- Country: Empire of Japan
- Branch: Imperial Japanese Army
- Type: Infantry
- Garrison/HQ: Kumamoto
- Nickname: Serene Division
- Engagements: World War II: Battle of Iwo Jima

The 46th Division (第46師団, Dai-yonjūroku Shidan) was an infantry division of the Imperial Japanese Army. Its call sign was the Serene Division (静兵団, Sei Heidan).

== Origins ==
The 46th Division was formed 14 May 1943 (82 years ago) in Kumamoto, simultaneously with the 42nd, 43rd and 47th divisions. The formation nucleus was the 66th Independent Infantry Brigade and headquarters of the 6th division. Troops were drawn from the Kumamoto Divisional District (Shikanku), which consisted of the Kumamoto, Oita, Miyazaki, and Kagoshima prefectures.

== Deployment ==
The 46th division was initially assigned to the Western District Army to strengthen the mainland defenses.

The 46th division was temporarily assigned to the 16th Army and ordered to move south in October 1943. The 46th artillery regiment was detached and left behind that time.

The Division's 123rd Regiment landed in Sumba of the Lesser Sunda Islands in late November 1943. Soon the 46th division was reassigned to the 19th army. In February 1944, the 147th Regiment landed in nearby Sumbawa island. The divisional headquarters were established on the Sumbawa island. The remaining 145th Regiment was unable to be transported and instead was diverted from Saipan in June 1944 to Iwo Jima under the Lieutenant General Tadamichi Kuribayashi's Ogasawara Corps, where it was wiped out in the Battle of Iwo Jima in February - March 1945.

The 19th Army was disbanded on 1 March 1945 and the 46th division was transferred to the 7th Area Army. Consequently, the 123rd and 147th infantry regiments were removed from Sumba and Sumbawa islands, respectively, and sent to Malay Peninsula in April 1945, landing in Singapore. These were disbanded at Kluang, Johor province after the surrender of Japan 15 August 1945 (80 years ago).

== Commanders ==
- Lieutenant General Takashi Kayashima - 10 June 1943 - 15 October 1943
- Lieutenant General Wakamatsu Tadaichi 15 October 1943 - 14 November 1944
- Lieutenant General Kokubushin Shichiro 14 November 1944 - till disbanded

== Headquarters and senior staff at disbandment ==
- Chiefs of Staff: Colonel Nizeki Eisaku, Lieutenant Colonel Masugi Kazuo, Major Yamamoto Tatsuo, and Major Emi Hideaki
- Adjutant: Lieutenant Colonel Tsuchiya Masanori
- 123 Infantry regiment: Colonel Chujo Toyo-ba
- 145 Infantry regiment: annihilated at Iwo Jima
- 147 Infantry regiment: Colonel Sairenji
- 46th Division tank company: Major Matsunaga YoshiSho
- 46th Division signals company: Captain Harada Magokai
- 46th Division transport company: Captain Arima Yasunari
- 46th Division ordnance company: Major Omoneman Tetsuo
- 46th Division labour company: Accountant Lieutenant Santsumori Bun'ichi
- 46th Division field hospital: Surgeon Colonel Tanaka Heikichi

== See also ==
- List of Japanese Infantry Divisions

== Reference and further reading ==
- Madej, W. Victor. Japanese Armed Forces Order of Battle, 1937-1945 [2 vols] Allentown, PA: 1981
- HataYu 彦編 "Japanese army and navy comprehensive encyclopedia," second edition, University of Tokyo Press, 2005
- Toyama Misao-Morimatsu Toshio eds "Imperial Army curriculum overview" Furong Shobo Publishing, 1987
- Separate volume history reader Senki series No.32 - Pacific Division military history, Shinjinbutsuoraisha, 1996
