= 1st Tank Division (Imperial Japanese Army) =

Tank Division of IJA

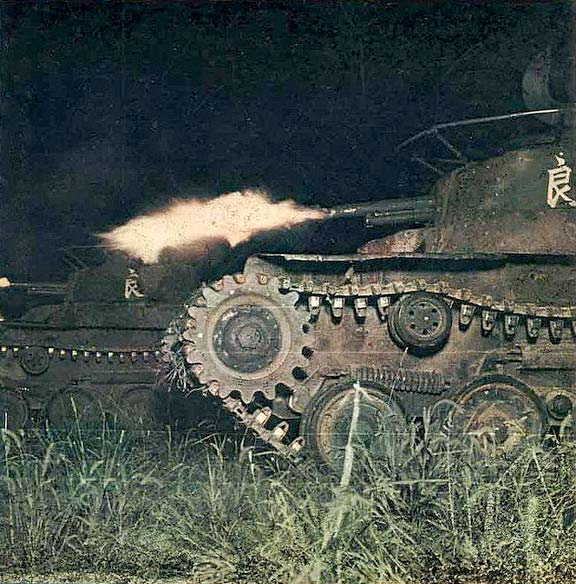
- Type 97 Chi-Ha tanks of the IJA 1st Tank Division during a night training exercise, 1943
- Active: 1942–1945
- Disbanded: 1945
- Country: Empire of Japan
- Branch: Imperial Japanese Army
- Type: Armored division
- Size: Division
- Garrison/HQ: Tokyo, Japan
- Nickname: 拓 = Taku (expand)
- Engagements: Second Sino-Japanese War; World War II

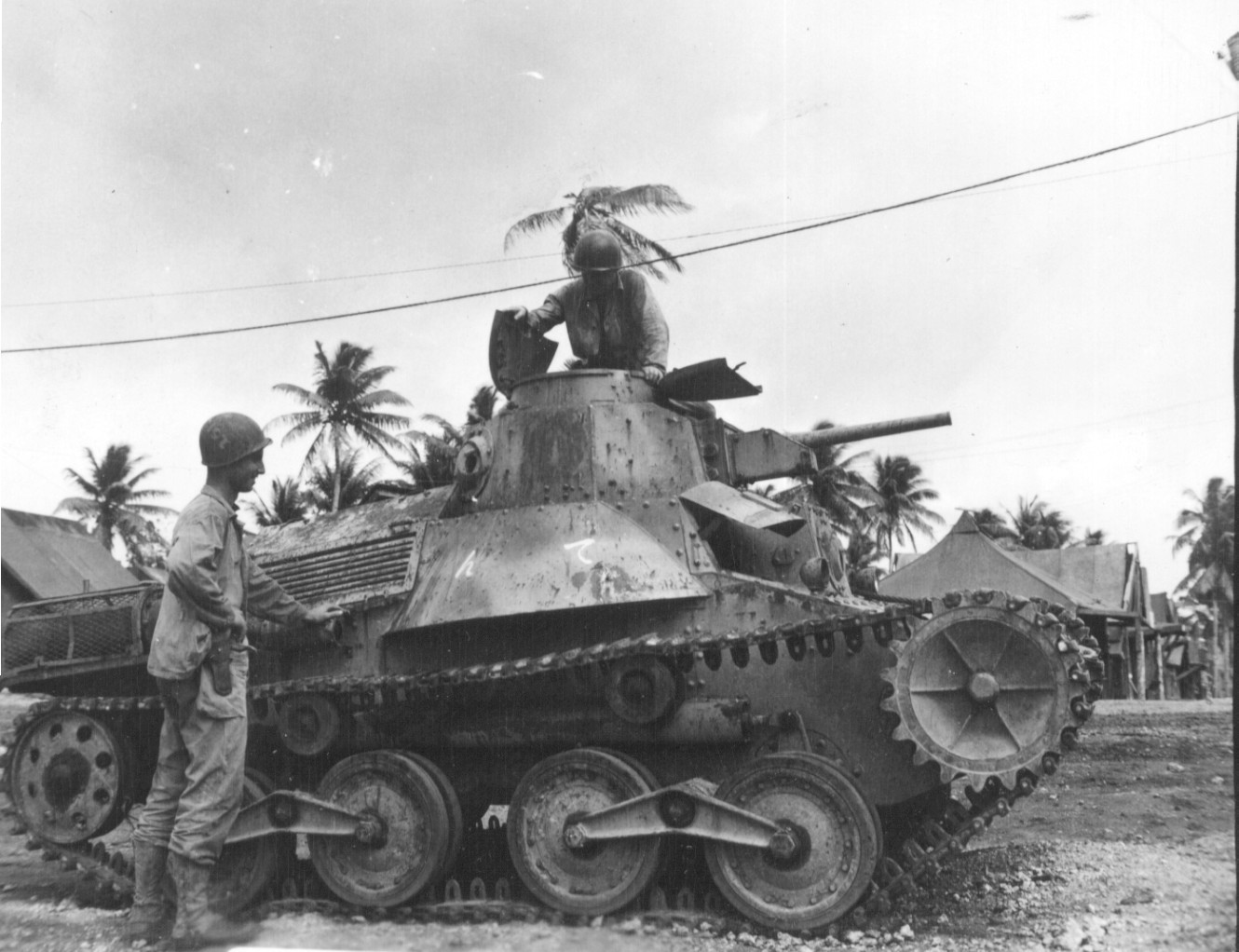
Tank from IJA 9th Armored Regiment captured on Guam

The 1st Tank Division (戦車第1師団, Sensha Dai-ichi Shidan), was one of four armored divisions of the Imperial Japanese Army in World War II.

== History ==
The 1st Tank Brigade was created out of four separate armored regiments based in Manchukuo on June 24, 1942. With the addition of one infantry regiment, it was soon raised to the status of a full armored division. Stationed in Ning'an in northern Manchukuo, it was tasked primarily with border patrol of Manchukuo's eastern frontier with the Soviet Union under the overall command of the Japanese First Area Army.

As the situation in the Pacific War against the Allies deteriorated for Japan, in March 1944, the IJA 9th Armored Regiment of the 1st Tank Division was reassigned to the IJA 31st Army, and sent to Saipan, where it was annihilated at the subsequent Battle of Saipan and Battle of Guam. The remaining three regiments participated in Operation Ichi-Go in mainland China. The IJA 3rd Armored Regiment of the 1st Tank Division was reassigned to China and attached to the 11th Army until the end of the war.

In March 1945, the 1st Tank Division with its 5th Armored Regiment was reassigned to the Japanese home islands in preparation for the expected invasion by Allied forces. It gained the IJA 1st Armored Regiment from the 3rd Tank Division, and formed part of the IJA 36th Army under the Japanese Twelfth Area Army. The headquarters unit and IJA 1st Armored Regiment were based in Sano, Tochigi, with the IJA 5th Armored Regiment stationed at Ōtawara, Tochigi (and later relocated to Kazo, Saitama, and the IJA 1st Mechanized Infantry Regiment and the Division’s mechanized artillery stationed at Tochigi. Anticipating that Allied forces would land at Kujūkuri Beach, the 1st Tank Division was to hold a defensive line stretching from Mount Tsukuba to the Tama River, with forward units deployed to Choshi, Chiba. The surrender of Japan came before the landing, and the 1st Armored Division did not see any combat on Japanese soil.

The 1st Tank Division was demobilized in September 1945 with the rest of the Imperial Japanese Army.

== Commanding officer ==
	Name	From	To
1	Lieutenant General Toshimoto Hoshino	1 September 1942	15 June 1945
2	Lieutenant General Nobuo Hosomi	15 June 1945	30 September 1945

== Structure (1945) ==
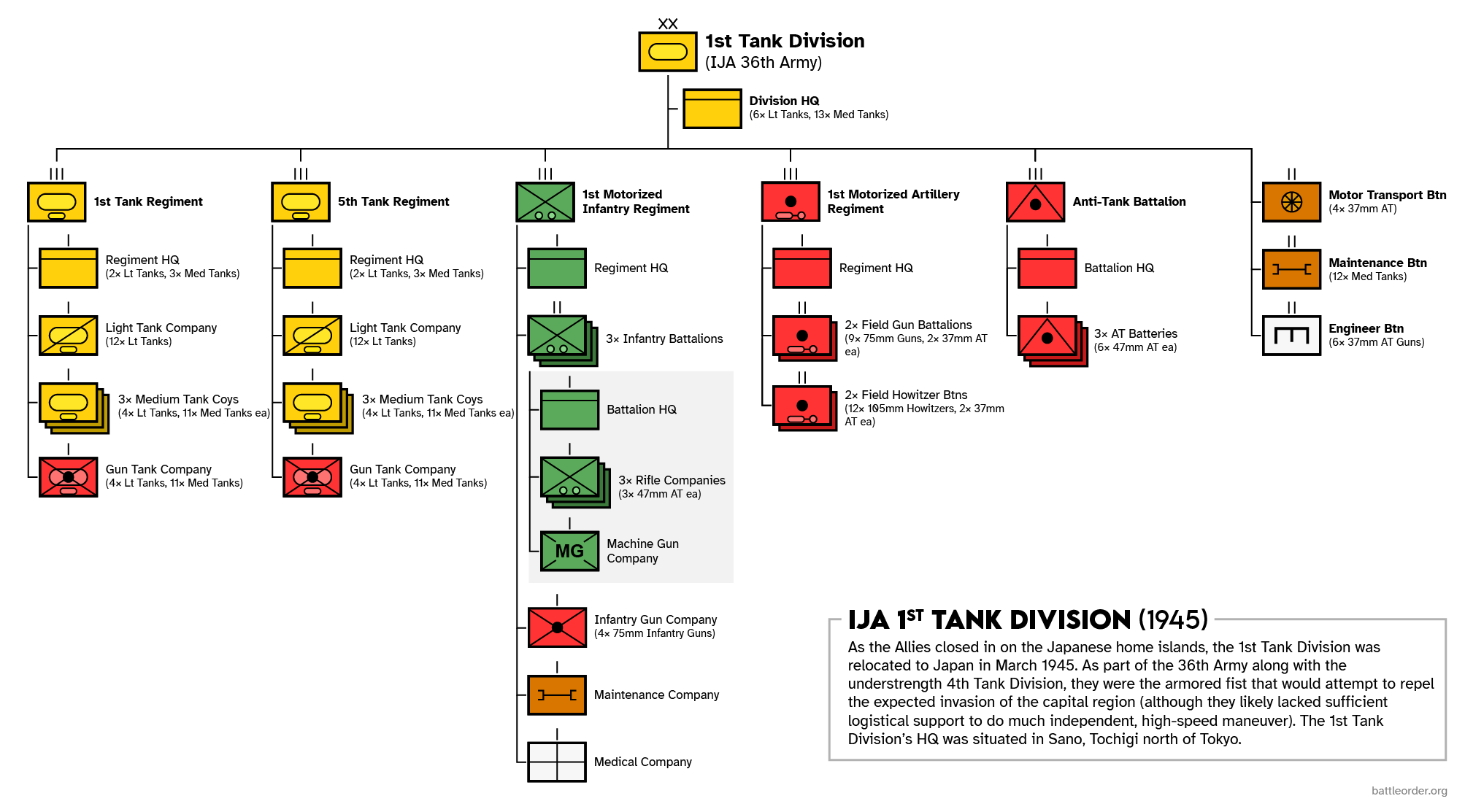
1st Tank Division (IJA) organization, 1945

The 1st Tank Division, after being relocated to Japan in 1945, consisted of a division headquarters, two tank regiments (roughly battalion-sized), one motorized infantry regiment, one motorized artillery regiment, one anti-tank battalion, one motor transport battalion, one maintenance battalion, and one engineer battalion.

- Division Headquarters
- 1st Tank Regiment
- 5th Tank Regiment
- 1st Motorized Infantry Regiment
- 1st Motorized Artillery Regiment
- Anti-Tank Battalion
- Motor Transport Battalion
- Maintenance Battalion
- Engineer Battalion

== See also ==
- List of Japanese armored divisions
