= Battle of West Hunan =

Battle of World War II and the Second Sino-Japanese War

- Part of the Second Sino-Japanese War of World War II
Date	April 6 – June 7, 1945 (2 months and 1 day)
Location	Western part of Hunan province, near Zhijiang Dong Autonomous County in the Republic of China
Result	Chinese victory

Belligerents
China; United States (air support only)	Japan

Commanders and leaders
(Republic of China (1912–1949)) He Yingqin (Republic of China (1912–1949)) Wang Yaowu (Republic of China (1912–1949)) Tang Enbo (Republic of China (1912–1949)) Liao Yaoxiang (Republic of China (1912–1949)) Zhang Lingfu	(Empire of Japan) Yasuji Okamura (Empire of Japan) Ichirō Banzai

Strength
110,000 in Hunan; 200,000 in total 400 aircraft	80,000

Casualties and losses
Chinese figures: 21,040 casualties (Note: The total number of killed, wounded, or missing does not match up with the total number of casualties in the statistical table); 7,817 killed; 12,784 wounded; 380 missing; 11 American pilots	Japanese figures for losses of the 20th Army from April to June : According to Senshi Sōsho : 695 killed; 1,181 wounded (including 322 who died from wounds); 24,640 fallen ill (including 2,301 who died from illnesses); 4,030 total deaths (Note: The discrepancy for the number of deaths was from May where the total number of deaths was recorded as 1,743 while the specific number of troops killed in action, died from combat wounds, and died from illnesses recorded in the same month totaled only 1,031); According to the medical department of the 20th Army : 1,720 killed; 2,691 wounded (including 275 who died from wounds); 27,372 fallen ill (including 1,992 who died from illnesses); 3,987 total deaths; Chinese figures: 36,358 killed or wounded; 12,651 killed; 23,707 wounded; 180 captured
- 8,563 civilians

The Battle of West Hunan (Chinese: 湘西會戰), also known as the Battle of Xuefeng Mountains (Chinese: 雪峰山戰役) and the Zhijiang Campaign (Chinese: 芷江戰役), was the Japanese invasion of west Hunan and the subsequent Allied counterattack that occurred between 6 April and 7 June 1945, during the last months of the Second Sino-Japanese War. Japanese strategic aims for this campaign were to seize Chinese airfields and secure railroads in West Hunan, and to achieve a decisive victory that their depleted land forces needed.

This campaign, if successful, would also have allowed Japan to attack Sichuan and eventually the Chinese wartime capital Chongqing. Although Japan was able to make initial headways, Chinese forces with air support from the Americans were able to turn the tide and forced the Japanese into a rout, recovering a substantial amount of lost ground.

This was the last major Japanese offensive, and the last of 22 major battles during the war to involve more than 100,000 troops. Concurrently, the Chinese managed to repel a Japanese offensive in Henan and Hubei and launched a successful attack on Japanese forces in Guangxi, turning the course of the war sharply in China's favor even as they prepared to launch a full-scale counterattack across South China.

== Background ==
By April 1945, China had already been at war with Japan for more than seven years. Both nations were exhausted by years of battles, bombings and blockades. From 1941 to 1943, both sides maintained a "dynamic equilibrium", where field engagements were often numerous, involved large numbers of troops and produced high casualty counts, but the results of which were mostly indecisive. Operation Ichi-Go in 1944 changed the status quo, as Japanese forces were able to break through the inadequate Chinese defenses and occupy eastern Henan, a corridor in the eastern parts of Hunan through Changsha and eastern parts of Guangxi through Guilin–Liuzhou, connecting Japanese-held areas from north to south in a continuous railway corridor.

However, the Japanese victory resulted in very little actual benefit for them: the operation drained Japanese manpower and a weakened Japanese army had to defend a longer front with more partisan activity in occupied areas. The opening up of north–south railway connections did little to improve Japanese logistics, for only one train ran from Guangzhou to Wuhan in April 1945, and due to fuel shortages the primary mode of transportation for Japanese troops was on foot.

On the other hand, although the Chinese government in Chongqing had lost land access to their remaining forces in Zhejiang, Anhui and Jiangxi with their defeat in Ichi-Go, Chinese fortunes in the war improved with the retaking of northern Burma by Allied and Chinese forces. On 4 February 1945, the first convoy of trucks reached Kunming from the British railhead in Ledo, India, over the newly completed Stilwell Road and the northern section of the Burma Road; using this road link, over 50,000 tonnes of petroleum started to arrive into China every month. By April 1945, enough materiel had become available to the Chinese army to equip 35 divisions with American equipment. A major counter offensive was planned.

== Order of battle ==
=== China ===
- Commander-in-Chief: He Yingqin

- 3rd Front Army: Tang Enbo

- 27th Army Group: Li Yutang

- 26th Corps: Ting Chih-pan

41st Division: Tung Gee-Tao
4th Division: Chiang Hsiu-jen

- 94th Corps: Mu Ting-fang

5th Division: Li Tse-fen
43rd Division: Li Shih-lin
121st Division: Ch Ching-min

- New 6th Corps: Liao Yao-hsiang

14th Division: Lung Tien-wu
New 22nd Division: Li Tao

- 4th Front Army: Wang Yao-wu

- 18th Corps: Hu Lien

11th Division: Yang Po-tao
18th Division: Chin Tao-shan
118th Division: Tai Pu

- 73rd Corps: Han Chun

15th Division: Liang Chi-lu
77th Division: Tang Sheng-hai
193rd Division: Hsiao Chuang-kuang

- 74th Corps: Shih Chung-cheng

51st Division: Chao Chih-tao
57th Division: Li Yen
58th Division: Tsai Jen-chieh

- 100th Corps: Li Tien-hsia

19th Division: Yang Yin
63rd Division: Hsu Chih-hsiu

13th Division: Chin Li-san
6th Provincial Division: Chao Chi-ping

assorted independent units

- 10th Army Group; Wang Ching-chiu

- 39th Corps; Liu Shang-chih (uncommitted)

51st Division; Shih Hun-hsi

- 92nd Corps; Hou Ching-ju

21st Division; Li Tse-fen
142nd Division; Li Chun-ling (uncommitted)

Air Support (400 aircraft)

- Chinese Air Force

1st Air Group
2nd Air Group
3rd Air Group
5th Air Group

- U.S. Air Force

14th Air Force

=== Japan ===
- 20th Army: Ichirō Banzai 板西一良
  - 34th Division: Takeo Ban 伴健雄
  - 47th Division: Hiroshi Watanabe 渡辺洋
  - 68th Division: Mikio Tsutsumi 堤三樹男
  - 116th Division: Ginnosuke Uchida 内田銀之助
  - Elements of the 64th Division
  - 86th Independent Mixed Brigade

== Japanese strategic objectives ==
For this campaign, the Imperial Japanese had three main objectives. The first of which was to neutralize the Chinese airfield at Zhijiang, whose complement of USAAF and ROCAF was ensuring Allied air superiority in the region and a base for U.S. bombers, either by physically reaching the airfield, located only 435 km (270 mi) from Chongqing, and securing it, or simply by pressing forward close enough to the airfield to force the Chinese to destroy the installation.

Their second objective was to secure their control of the Hunan-Guangxi and Guangzhou-Hankou railways. A third objective was to preemptively disrupt the planned Chinese offensive in the region.

== Preparations for battle ==
By this point of the war, Japan was losing the battle in Burma and facing constant attacks from Chinese forces in the countryside. Spare troops for this campaign were limited. The Japanese army began preparations for the battle in March 1945, constructing two highways with forced Chinese labor: the Heng-Shao Highway ran from Hengyang in a northwest direction to Shaoyang, a Japanese-controlled city in central Hunan a mere 100 km (62 mi) from Zhijiang; and the Tan-Shao Highway from Xiangtan, southwest to Shaoyang. Supplies and equipment were stockpiled near Shaoyang, to be the headquarters of the Japanese 20th Corps, led by Ichirō Banzai. Under it were the Japanese 34th, 47th, 64th, 68th and 116th Divisions, as well as the 86th Independent Brigade, massing at various locations across Hunan, for a total of 80,000 men by early April.

In response, the Chinese National Military Council dispatched the 4th Front Army and the 10th and 27th Army Groups with He Yingqin as commander-in-chief. At the same time, it airlifted the entire New 6th Corps, an American-equipped corps and veterans of the Burma Expeditionary Force, from Kunming to Zhijiang. Chinese forces totaled 110,000 men in 20 divisions. They were supported by about 400 aircraft from the CAF 1st, 2nd, 3rd, 5th Air Groups and the USAAF 14th Air Force.

== Battle ==
Japanese forces took over the outskirts of Hunan with little resistance. However, they didn't realize that the Chinese forces were well prepared for the Japanese assault. The mountainous terrain was ideal for ambushes and mortar bombardment on approaching Japanese forces in the lower grounds.

The Chinese also had air superiority in this battle. After some defeats Japan decided to retreat. However, Chinese forces gave chase and inflicted heavy casualties on the Japanese. The local Chinese guerrilla forces then attacked the Japanese positions. Japan ended up losing a large amount of territory that they once occupied.

The Japanese drove east while two smaller forces to the north and south moved generally parallel to the main column. The Chinese Combat Command's advisory and liaison system was immediately called into play. At a meeting on 14 April, the day after the Japanese general advance began, Generals Ho and McClure agreed on the basic plan to counter the enemy attack. Chinese armies would be concentrated to the north and south to prepare to strike the enemy advance in the flanks and rear. The Chinese center around Chihchiang would be strengthened by moving the New 6th Army, composed of two veteran divisions of the Burma campaign, into the area.

By late April, the New 6th Army began concentrating at Chihchiang. Although their deployment from Burma diverted scarce fuel from the U.S. Fourteenth Air Force, American airmen continued to fly repeated missions against the attacking Japanese. Meanwhile, other Chinese armies moved into position, the 94th to the south and the 100th and 18th to the north. Meanwhile, the 74th Army, defending the Chinese center on a fifty-mile front, was putting up a stout resistance, slowing the Japanese advance.

On 3 May a Chinese-American staff conference decided to counterattack a Japanese detachment near Wu-yang, seventy miles southeast of Chihchiang. The subsequent engagement by the 5th Division of the 94th Army on 5 and 6 May was completely successful. Over the next few days, the 5th and 121st Divisions, also of the 94th Army, repeatedly outflanked the Japanese and hustled them north. The Chinese 18th and 100th Armies moved into the Japanese rear. With the 94th Army threatening from the south, the Japanese were forced into a general retreat and by 7 June were back at their initial starting positions.

=== Siege of Wugang ===
The Chinese 74th Army was headquartered in Wugang. 300 soldiers of 74th Army were lent to OSS Detachment 202 for guerilla operations in east Hunan. OSS Team Muskrat had 7 American members, Captain Walter Mansfeld and 6 men. They departed Kunming in Yunnan to Wugang in west Hunan and visited the Chinese 74th army stationed there. The 74th army lent them 300 Chinese soldiers to train as guerillas for their operations in east Hunan and then they left to east Hunan to join other Chinese guerillas and attack the Japanese between Xiangtang and Hengyang. The OSS visit to Wugang and departure to east Hunan took place in February-March

By April after other Chinese soldiers left the city, only a reinforced battalion of the 74th Army was left to defend the wall city of Wugang, a Chinese battalion only had 400 to 1,000 soldiers. The stone city walls of Wugang and its water filled moat were built in the Ming, upgraded from an earlier Song rammed earth wall. Chinese civilians in Wugang donated sticky rice to help soldiers built two secondary defensive walls out of glutinous rice, sand and earth outside the city walls and moat. The Japanese Sekine division detachment besiege Wugang for 7 days. A Japanese division had 10,000 to 20,000 soldiers and the Japanese expected to capture Wugang in one day. Japanese had heavy artillery and tanks and bombarded Wugang city on three sides with about 100 artillery pieces and tanks since 27 April and sent infantry assaults. Japanese soldiers only breached the two makeshift ouster walls built with glutinous rice and earth, and not the moat and city walls, and the Japanese suffered heavy casualties at the makeshift outer walls. The Japanese bombarded the western gate area of the stone city walls of Wugang with artillery on 1 May to provide cover for a human wave of Japanese soldiers carrying explosives to detonate themselves at the walls, most of the Japanese were killed by Chinese fire, and only a little over 10 or 12 Japanese made it to the walls and blew holes in them, but the Chinese plugged the holes with sandbags. The Japanese then tried escalade with ladders on the walls, but Chinese troops used Thompson submachine guns and American flamethrowers to kill the Japanese soldiers. The Chinese 44th division then came and attacked the Japanese besiegers from their rear, throwing the Japanese into panic and chaos, and then the Chinese battalion inside Wugang charged out at the Japanese and the Japanese were slaughtered as they retreated, failing to breach the city walls.

Xinning was retaken after Wugang's siege was lifted and Japanese were fleeing to Baoqing. To Baoqing's north by 6 miles, Zhuloupu was recaptured by Chinese.

=== Ethnic minorities ===
Ethnic minority Yao people formed a militia squad called the sniffer-gun team (嗅槍隊) under Lan Chunda using only smoothbore musket shotguns and small calibre muzzle loading smoothbore cannon and they defeated and slaughtered Japanese soldiers in the Battle of West Hunan. The name of their unit came from the fact that they had to hold the musket with its match in front of their face, making it look like they were smelling it. There were over 100 Han and Yao people in the gun sniffing team. Yao mountain gun sniffing squad (“瑶山嗅枪队”) was one of several militias including Middle School Student anti-Japanese volunteer corps, Longtan People's Anti-Japanese Force and Longtan Peasant Self-Defence Corps. All ethnicities used hoes, spears, musket shotguns and other weapons to attack the Japanese. Japanese soldiers were beaten to death and killed by villagers with farm tools in addition to muskets, like carrying poles, wooden sticks, rakes, hoes and knives in Huimashan (Huima mountain) area. A farmer surnamed Li used a rake to kill a Japanese soldier who tried to rape his wife.

Yao people in southern Hunan were also against Japan.

There are muskets which were used by militia against Japanese in the battle of West Hunan, currently on display in the "Hongjiang City National War of resistance Memorial Museum" in Xiangxi village, Tangwan town in Hongjiang city, Huaihua prefecture.

The ethnic minority Yao people hunted for food like boars and made homemade muzzle loading smoothbore cannons and muskets which they then used against Japanese, like the small cannon known as the 9 hoop gun (九箍槍), the muzzle loading shotgun musket called the "sniffing gun" (嗅嗅槍) which fired pellets (丸子彈) in Xiaoshajiang. The Yao people used their home made improvised cannons firing grapeshot and musket shotguns firing pellets along with iron traps in Tianlongjie to ambush Japanese. The Japanese were unable to remove the iron pells all over their bodies. The Yao also used a home made improvised wooden cannon that fired iron sand pellets and was made from a tree trunk that was hollowed out known as the chatter gun (嘰咕槍). The Japanese raped Yao women but were massacred by Yao militia and Japanese were too scared to go into Weijiayuan.

The Japanese gang raped and killed Yao women and bayoneted Yao babies, and the Yao militias used their home made cannons to ambush Japanese soldiers in cooperation with the Chinese 19th Division's 56th Regiment in Xiaoshajiang in Longhui.

The Japanese suffered heavy casualties to the home made smoothbore muzzle loading cannons, muskets and traps. Soybeans, corn kernels were mixed with metal shards and iron pellets in the cannons and muskets, along with pit traps, snares and iron traps in Tianlongjie.

The Yao hunters used double barreled shotguns at Luohongjie and stuffed them with iron pellets, ceramic shards and gravel, among the Yao hunters were Zhao Yishan, Liu Fei, Wei Laoqi, Uncle Liu Er and they worked with regular Chinese soldiers under battalion commander Wei Jun. The Japanese fled to Weijia after escaping to Laowali after being ambushed at Luohongjie. At Qingshanjie the Japanese were exterminated. Another Japanese unit lost over 12 wounded and over 30 dead out of over 100 soldiers and the Japanese had rifles and machine guns. Japanese were then left injured in severe pain and screaming after Yao hunters used their shotguns to fire pelles into their bodies. Japan then used machine guns against the shotgun armed hunters to escape, but only 7 Chinese soldiers were killed and none of the Yao hunters under Liu Er died, while only about 20 Japanese broke out alive and more than 90 Japanese injured were captured and more than 80 Japanese were killed and 3 Japanese killed themselves from the pain of the shotgun pellets.

The real life sniffing guns used during the war against Japan are also mentioned in modern novels.

More than 230 Japanese were killed in 27 battles with muzzle loading muskets in Dongkou county by Tongshan township's Yao people.

Miao and Dong people participated in the fighting against Japan in addition to the Yao under Lan Chunda.

The first militia self-defence force of Zhijiang used modern rifles and home made muskets and had 580 people in 36 self defence detachments and 6 township self deence battallions, with the corps commander being the county magistrate. It was founded in September 1938.

In west Hunan's Xupu county, Wenshui township, Hongqi town, Xiaohengdong Yaoshan village, Ding Changshan and other ethnic Yao people formed the "Yao people's Bird gun team" using bird guns (smooth bore muzzle loading shotguns) in the Wenshui Township Lingjiao Farmer's Association in the battle of West Hunan in April 1945. Captain Dng Qihuai, the third uncle of 17 year old Ding Changshan were among the Yao in the team. There wre Japanese in Longtan at Hongyanling and between Longtan and Longhui was Lao'antang, Wangxiang mountain, Majinggu and Dongkou mountain gate where the Japanese 109th regiment's 4,000 soldiers intended to join them on 17 April 1945. Baoqing prefecture and Chenzhou prefecture were linked by the road in which Wenshui township's Lao'antang mountain was located. They chose Kafengjie as the location of the ambush against the Japanese and a secondary location 2 km away at Wangixang mountain in a forest as the place to attract the attetion of the Japanese by the Yao people's bird gun team under Ding Changshan and captain Ding Qihuai, working wit the NRA 74th Arm 51st division. The mountain road was covered by 50 NRA troops and 15 Yao militia with musket shotguns and they attacked the Japanese with grenades, muskets and rifles wat Wangxiang mountain on 18 April. There were Japanese soldiers who were blinded in both eyes by musket pellets but were still alive and unable to see anything. Ding Changbao then said the Yao militia musketeers then retreated to Kafengjie to lure the Japanese into the main ambush and went in zigzags. The Japanese soldiers were then decimated by cannons and guns at Kafengjie by the NRA. The Japanese fled to Yuzixi and Tangkanxi after losing over 400 casualties and were unable to get past Kafengjie after three days of fighting.

== Casualties ==
After the battle, the Japanese first announced that they only had 11,000 casualties (5,000 KIA). They later revised the figures to include an additional 15,000 casualties "due to diseases". Finally, they admitted to a casualty figure of 27,000. On the other hand, the Chinese claimed to have inflicted on the Japanese 36,358 casualties, including 12,651 KIA. The Chinese sustained 21,040 casualties (including 824 officers) with 7,817 KIA and 380 MIA. In the report from the First Demobilization Bureau regarding the battle of West Hunan, the Japanese Army suffered about 15,000 killed and about 50,000 wounded. The 109th Infantry Regiment of the 116th Division was nearly wiped out. By April 25, the 1st Battalion had only 125 troops left, the 2nd Battalion had only 246 left, and the 3rd Battalion had only 175 left.

== Aftermath ==
In the battle, the 51st division of the 74th corps "blocked more than 6,000 enemy troops in the area east of Longtansi (龍潭司), repeatedly defeated the enemy in Fangdong (放洞), Hongyan (紅岩), and Dahuangsha (大黃沙) for more than 20 days, smashing the enemy's attempt to enter and exit An Giang to block the Yuan River and sweep the Xuefeng Mountain. The enemy was annihilated in Fangdong with unprecedented success, completing the arduous mission and laying the foundation for ultimate victory in the battle." On November 24, 1945, the Nationalist Government awarded the Flying Tiger flag to the division.
