= 47th Division (Imperial Japanese Army) =

- Active: 1943 - 1945
- Country: Empire of Japan
- Branch: Imperial Japanese Army
- Type: Infantry
- Garrison/HQ: Hirosaki
- Nickname: Bullet Division
- Engagements: Battle of West Hunan

Commanders
- Notable commanders: Hiroshi Watanabe

The 47th Division (第47師団, Dai-yonjūnana Shidan) was an infantry division of the Imperial Japanese Army. Its call sign was the Bullet Division (弾兵団, Dan Heidan).

The 47th Division was formed 14 May 1943 in Hirosaki, simultaneously with the 42nd, 43rd and 46th divisions. The nucleus for the division formation was the 67th independent infantry brigade and the headquarters of the 57th division. The 47th division was initially assigned to the Northern District Army.

On 13 June 1944, a 12th detachment comprising three infantry battalions and mountain artillery battalion was separated from the 47th division and sent to Luzon, where it was expanded to the 58th Independent Mixed Brigade and fought in Battle of Luzon until surrender of Japan 15 August 1945.

In December 1944, the division was assigned to the 43rd army and transferred to North China, where it participated in the disastrous Battle of West Hunan from April 1945.

The 47th division had met the surrender of Japan 15 August 1945 in Jinan and was demobilized starting from February 1946 in Qingdao, with the last ships landing in Sasebo, Nagasaki on 17 April 1945. In an unusual turn of events, a significant portion of the officers and soldiers joined the Chinese Communist Party and continued to fight the Kuomintang in the Chinese Civil War.

== See also ==
- List of Japanese Infantry Divisions
- Independent Mixed Brigades (Imperial Japanese Army)

== Reference and further reading ==
- Madej, W. Victor. Japanese Armed Forces Order of Battle, 1937-1945 [2 vols] Allentown, PA: 1981
