= Rihachirō Banzai =

Japanese general and politician

- 坂西 利八郎
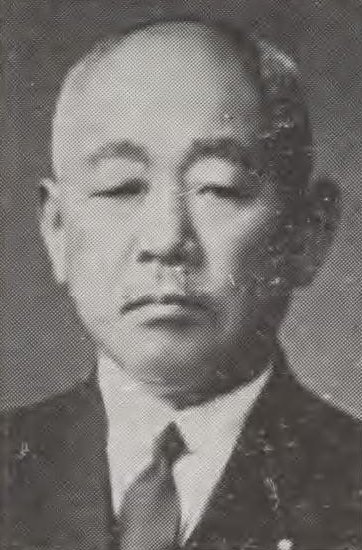

Member of the House of Peers
- In office 18 April 1927 – 14 May 1946 Nominated by the Emperor

Personal details
- Born: 5 February 1871 Wakayama Prefecture, Japan
- Died: 30 May 1950 (aged 79) Koshigoe, Kanagawa, Japan
- Relatives: Ichirō Banzai (son-in-law)

Military service
- Allegiance: Empire of Japan
- Branch/service: Imperial Japanese Army
- Years of service: 1892–1927
- Rank: Lieutenant General

Rihachirō Banzai (坂西 利八郎, Banzai Rihachirō; 5 February 1871 – 30 May 1950) was a lieutenant general in the Imperial Japanese Army and advisor to the Beiyang government in China, who later served as a member of the House of Peers. He was known as one of the foremost China Hands in the Japanese Army.

== Life ==
=== Career ===
Banzai Rihachirō was born in Wakayama Prefecture, the eldest son of Artillery Captain Banzai Ryoichi. After graduating from the Army Youth School, he attended the Imperial Japanese Army Academy, from which he graduated in July 1891. In March 1892, Banzai was commissioned as an artillery lieutenant in the 6th Field Artillery Regiment. From February 1895 to March 1896, he served in the First Sino-Japanese War. He attended the Army Artillery School, graduating in November 1896, and then going on to the Army War College, from which he graduated from in December 1900, as the fourteenth in his class.

Banzai was assigned to the Imperial Japanese Army General Staff Office, and was sent on a mission to the Qing Empire and an investigation mission to Manchuria. For a time, he served as an advisor to Yuan Shikai, the Viceroy of Zhili. He returned to Japan in May 1908. He went on an official visit to Europe as a military attaché along with the 12th Field Artillery Regiment, the commander of the 9th Field Artillery Regiment, and the IJA General Staff (residing in Beijing).

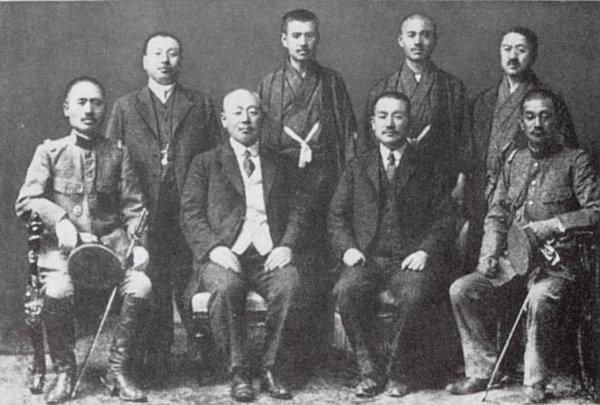
Banzai (lower row, second from left) with other Japanese officers in China, 1918

After the 1911 Revolution, Banzai returned to China and again served as advisor to Yuan Shikai, who became president. He subsequently advised seven of Yuan's successors in the Beiyang government. During this time, he operated an intelligence organisation out of Beijing known as the Banzai Mansion. His subordinates includes later Army China experts Kenji Doihara and Hayao Tada. This organisation promoted pro-Japanese forces during the Warlord Era, particularly the Anhui clique. Banzai took part in arranging the Nishihara Loans.

Banzai was promoted to the rank of major general in August 1917 and to lieutenant general in 1921. In April 1927, he retired from active service and entered the reserves. He served as a member of the House of Peers from 18 April 1927 to 14 May 1946.

=== Family ===
Banzai Rihachirō was the adoptive father of Ichirō Banzai, a lieutenant general in the Imperial Japanese Army. His brother Matahachi Banzai was an officer in the Imperial Japanese Navy, and his other brother Heihachi Banzai was a major general in the army.

== Ranks, Awards, and Honors ==
=== Court ranks ===
- Senior Eighth Rank, 6 July 1892
- Senior Sixth Rank, 27 December 1907
- Junior Third Rank, 16 May 1927

=== Orders (Empire of Japan) ===
- Order of the Golden Kite (4th rank),
- Order of the Rising Sun (4th rank),
- Meiji 37-8 Military Medal of Honor, 1 April 1906
- Order of the Sacred Treasure (3rd rank), 16 May 1914
- Order of the Sacred Treasure (2nd rank), 29 September 1918
- 2600th Anniversary Celebration of the Japanese Empire Honorary Medal, 10 November 1940

=== Orders (Qing Empire) ===
- Order of the Double Dragon (2nd rank), 2 July 1908
