= Order of the Double Dragon =

Qing dynasty order

Imperial Order of the Double Dragon 雙龍寶星
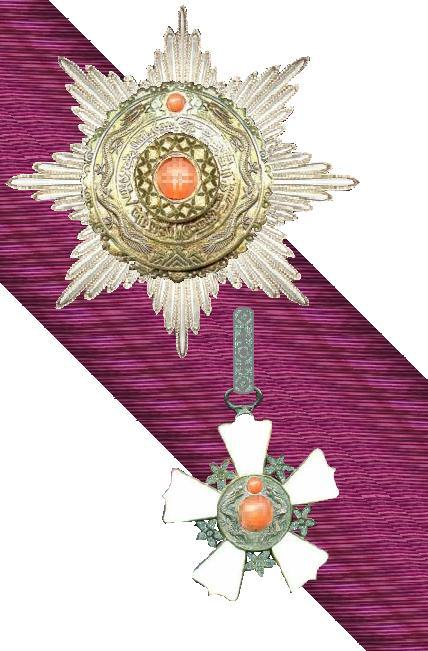
- Order of the Double Dragon, 1st Class

Awarded by the Emperor of China
- Type: Order
- Established: 1882
- Country: Qing dynasty
- Awarded for: outstanding services to the throne and the Qing court
- Status: Obsolete
- Founder: Guangxu Emperor

Precedence
- Next (higher): Order of the Blue Feather
- Next (lower): Order of the Imperial Throne
- Ribbon bar of the order (1st Class, 1st Grade)

The Imperial Order of the Double Dragon (simplified Chinese: 双龙宝星; traditional Chinese: 雙龍寶星; pinyin: Shuānglóng Bǎoxīng; lit. 'Double Dragon Precious Star') was an order awarded in the late Qing dynasty.

The Order was founded by the Guangxu Emperor on 7 February 1882 as an award for outstanding services to the throne and the Qing court. Originally it was awarded only to foreigners but was extended to Chinese subjects from 1908. It was the first Western-style Chinese order, established in the wake of the Second Opium War as part of efforts to engage with the West and adopt Western-style diplomatic practices. Traditionally the Chinese court did not have an honours system in the Western sense; however hat buttons, rank badges, feathers and plumes were routinely awarded by the Emperor to subjects and foreigners alike prior to and after the introduction of the Order of the Double Dragon. The order was replaced in 1911 during the last days of the Qing dynasty by the Order of the Imperial Throne, although this replacement was never fully implemented and the Republic of China discontinued the imperial orders after its establishment in 1912.

== Design ==
The order took on many different designs and forms until its abolition in 1911. Gradations were distinguished most commonly by differentiation in the type and size of precious stones inlaid, the shape of the medallion, the length of the ribbon, and the material used to construct the medallion. Gold and pearl were reserved for the higher classes, enamel and coral for the lowest classes. The original designs were similar in style and appearance to traditional Chinese insignia, but they proved cumbersome for many to wear and in 1897 they were redesigned in the form of a Western-style breast-badge, although the original designs were still awarded for some time afterwards. Similar symbolic motifs accompanied all designs over the award's history, most notably two dragons surrounding a central precious stone and flames which were connotative symbols of imperial authority. Other symbols of imperial authority - mountains, clouds, plum blossoms and characters with providential meanings - were added to variations of the designs over time.

== Classes ==
The order consisted of five classes, the first three of which were divided into three grades. The rules for award and the nature of the gradations was set out in the statues establishing the award in 1882. The rules were modified somewhat in 1897.

- First Class, First Grade: for emperors and kings of foreign nations
- First Class, Second Grade: for princes, and royal family members and relatives (later limited to royal family members who had earned, and not inherited, senior positions in government)
- First Class, Third Grade: for ministers of who had inherited their position, general ministers, and diplomatic envoys of the first rank.
- Second Class, First Grade: for diplomatic envoys of the second rank
- Second Class, Second Grade: for diplomatic envoys of the third rank and customs commissioners
- Second Class, Third Grade: for counselors of the first rank, consuls-general and military generals
- Third Class, First Grade: for counselors of the second and third rank, the entourage of consuls-general, and second-tier military officers
- Third Class, Second Grade: for deputy consuls, and third-tier military officers
- Third Class, Third Grade: for translators and military officers of the fourth and fifth tiers
- Fourth Class: for soldiers and non-commissioned officers
- Fifth Class: for businessmen and traders

== Recipients ==
Despite the comprehensive ranking system, the actual awarding of the classes was lopsided, and very few Fourth or Fifth class were ever given. The much higher ranking of translators and other civil servants in the system compared to even the wealthiest Western industrialists and businessmen was in part reflecting of the traditional Chinese antipathy towards profit-seeking and commercial individuals, compared to the honour accorded to the civil service. Despite patriarchal traditions however, foreign women were bestowed the order, including Canadian missionary Leonora King and American artist Katherine Carl. Native Chinese were granted the right to order in 1908, but very few Chinese ever received the award and it remained an order overwhelmingly awarded to foreigners.

=== Awards to the imperial family ===
- Guangxu Emperor, Sovereign
- Xuantong Emperor, Sovereign
- Zaitao

=== Chinese recipients ===
- Li Hongzhang
- Yinchang
- Liang Dunyan
- Lu Zhengxiang
- Hu Weide
- Wu Lien-teh

=== Foreign recipients ===
==== Class I ====
- Nicholas II, Emperor of All Russia, Class I Grade I in Diamonds, 4 May 1896
- Frederick III, German Emperor, Class I Grade I
- Leopold II, King of the Belgians, Class I Grade I
- Albert I, King of the Belgians, Class I Grade I
- Meiji, Emperor of Japan, Class I Grade I, 20 December 1898
- Gojong, Emperor of Korea, Class I Grade I, 1 December 1903
- Abu Bakar, Sultan of Johor, Class I Grade I, 1892
- Pakubuwono X, Susuhunan of Surakarta, Class I Grade I
- Sadanaru, Prince Fushimi, Class I Grade I, 27 April 1909 (Class I Grade II: 27 November 1904)
- Henry, Prince of Prussia, Class I Grade II
- Georg, Prince of Bavaria, Class I Grade II, 1903
- Eitel Friedrich, Prince of Prussia, Class I Grade II
- Rupprecht, Crown Prince of Bavaria, Class I Grade II
- Wilhelm, German Crown Prince, Class I Grade II
- Morimasa, Prince Nashimoto, Class I Grade II, 20 May 1903
- Hiroyasu, Prince Fushimi, Class I Grade II, 9 May 1903
- Kotohito, Prince Kan'in, Class I Grade II, 27 January 1904
- Baron Edmond de Gaiffier d'Hestroy, Belgium, Class I
- Prince Katsura Tarō, Prime Minister of Japan, Class I Grade II, 21 December 1907 (Class I Grade III: 18 December 1899)
- Georg von der Marwitz, Germany, Class I Grade II
- Erich von Gündell, Germany, Class I Grade II
- Duke Itō Hirobumi, Prime Minister of Japan, Class I Grade III, 5 December 1898
- Herbert von Bismarck, Prince of Bismarck, Class I Grade III
- Vladimir Sukhomlinov, Minister of War of Russia, Class I Grade III, 1911
- Porfirio Díaz, President of Mexico, Class I, 1910
- Alfred Meyer-Waldeck, Class I Grade II

==== Class II ====
- Dejan Subotić, Russia, Class II Grade I, 1896
- Konstantin Glinka, Russia, Class II Grade III, 1898
- Sir Halliday Macartney, United Kingdom, Class II Grade I, 1902
- Robert Bredon, United Kingdom, Deputy Inspector-general of Customs at Shanghai, Class II Grade III, 1902
- Rudolf Stöger-Steiner von Steinstätten, Austria, Class II Grade II, 1911
- Okura Kihachiro, Japan, Class II Grade II, 10 February 1912
- Paul von Buri, Germany, Class II Grade III
- John Edward Foley, United Kingdom, Traffic Manager of the Imperial Chinese Railways, Class II Grade III, 1902
- Rihachirō Banzai, Japan, Class II, 2 July 1908
- Adolf von Deines, Germany, Class II Grade I

==== Class III ====
- Rudolf, Prince of Liechtenstein, Class III Grade I
- Claude William Kinder CMG, United Kingdom, Chief Engineer Imperial Railways of North China, Class III Grade I, 1891
- Erich Raeder, Germany, Class III Grade II, 10 October 1898
- John Penniell, United Kingdom, Chief Instructor at the Nanking Naval College, Class III Grade II, 1902
- Józef Dowbor-Muśnicki, Russia, Class III
- Frank Arthur Morgan (1844–1907), United Kingdom, Commissioner of Imperial Chinese Maritime Customs, Class III, Grade 1

==== Unknown ====
- Alexei Nikolaevich, Tsarevich of Russia
- Camillio Romano Avezzana, Italy
- Major General Charles George Gordon, United Kingdom
- Cardinal Désiré-Joseph Mercier, Belgium
- Dr Leonora King, Canada
- Heinrich Johannes Bleeker, Germany
- Richard Theodore Greener, United States, 1902
- Baron Julien Liebaert, Belgium, Knight Grand Cross
- Victor Vifquain, United States
- Viscount João Vieira Lins Cansanção, Prime Minister of Brazil
- Thomas Adamson Consul General, United States
- Pernot Claudius Ferdinand, France
- Katharine Carl, United States
- Dr Dugald Christie, Scottish medical missionary, associated with the United Presbyterian Church of Scotland, 1897.

== Gallery ==
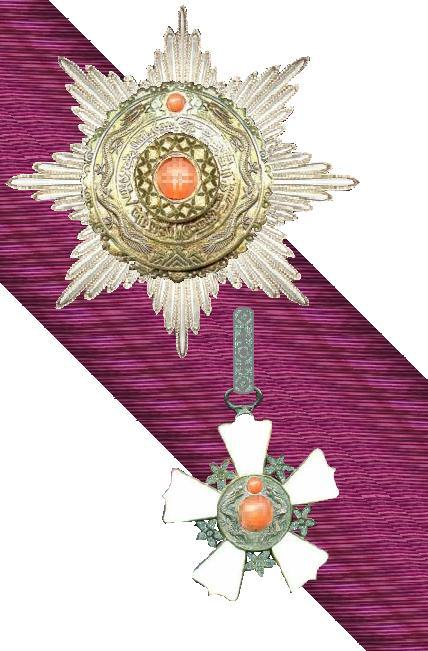
I Class

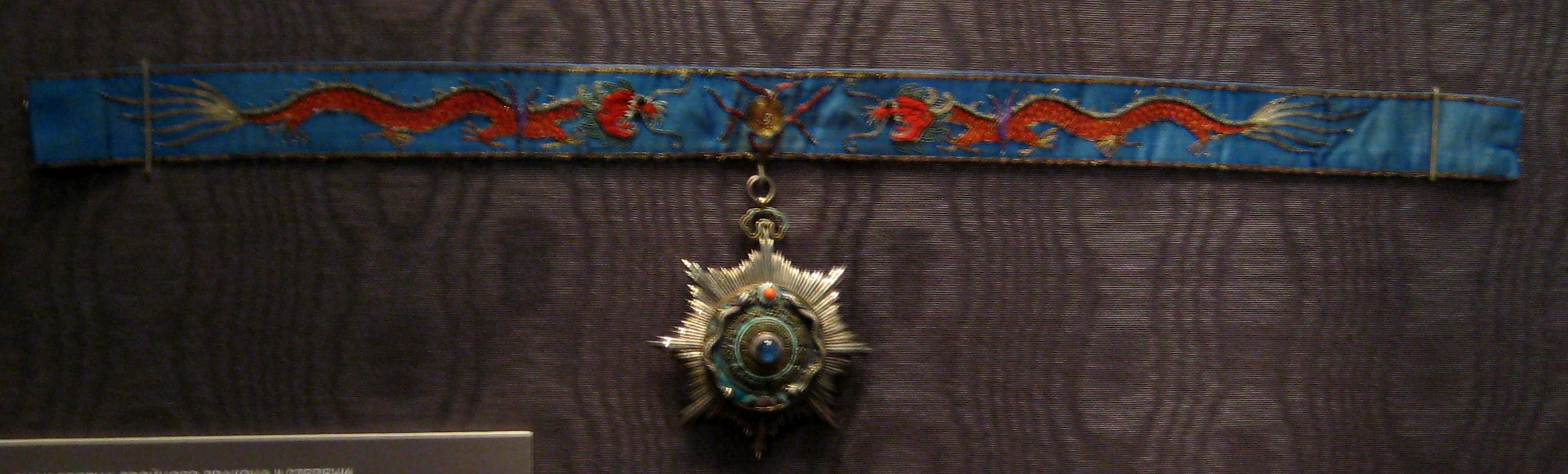
II Class

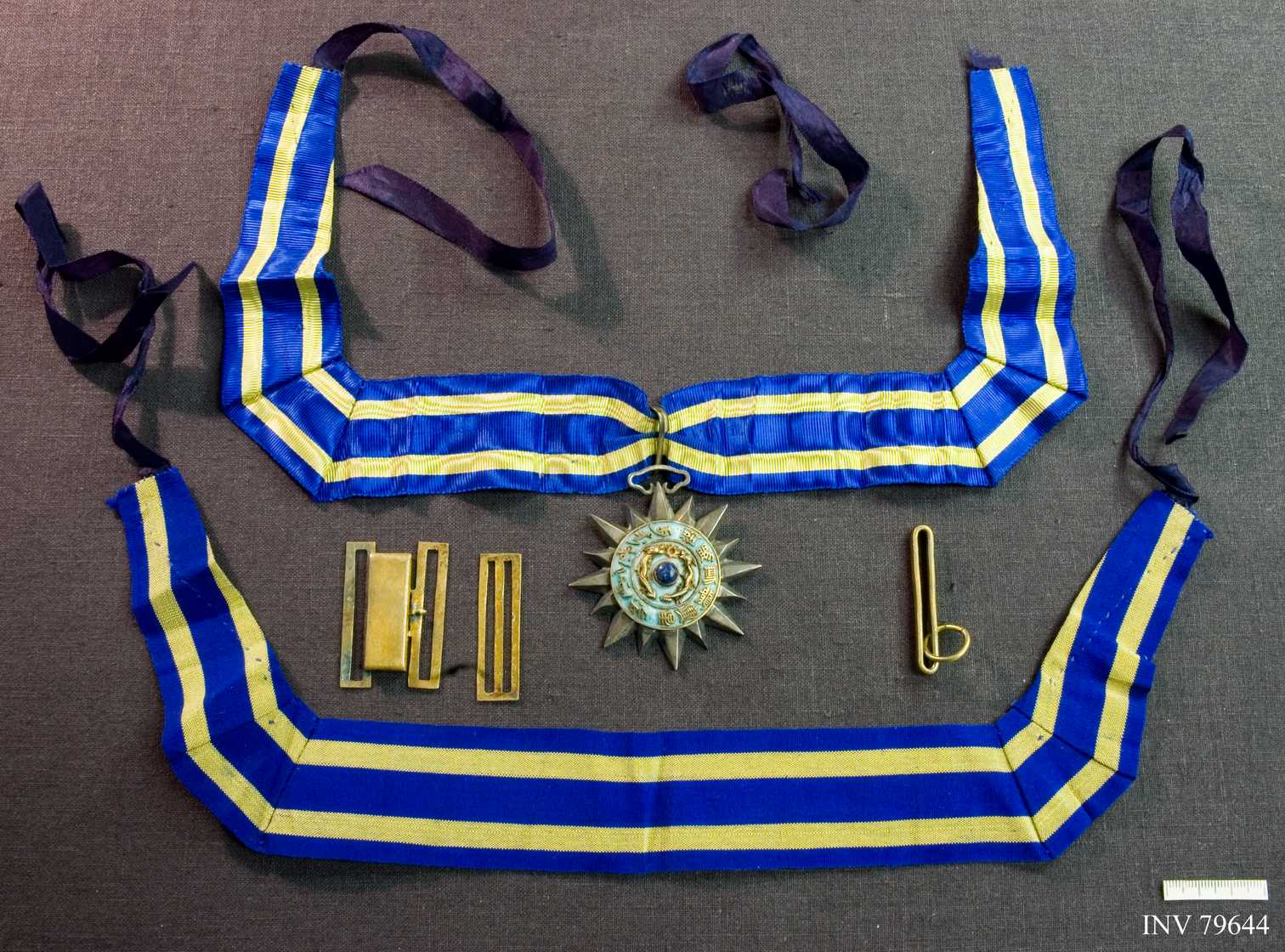
IV Class

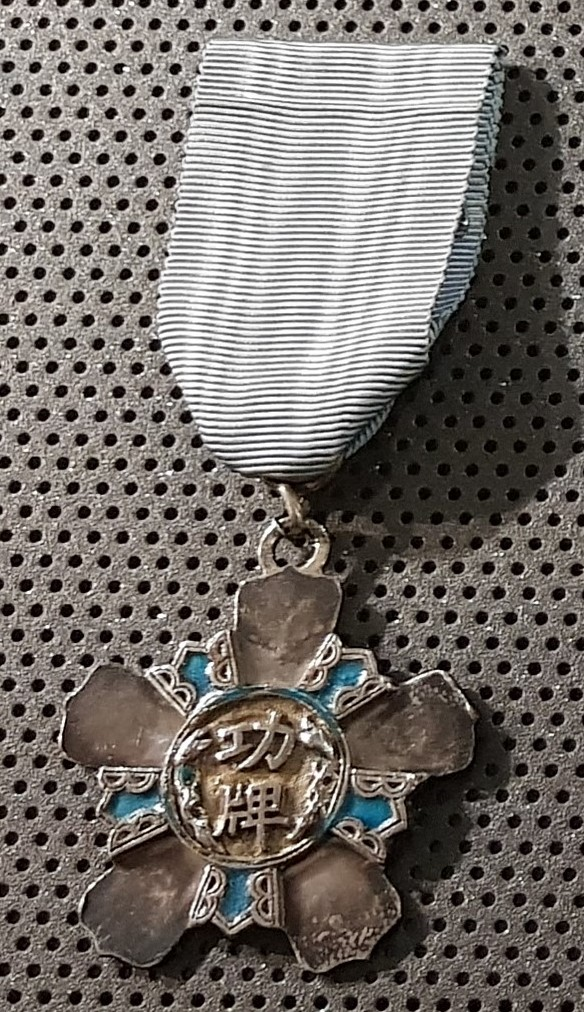
V Class

== See also ==
- Order of the Precious Brilliant Golden Grain: ROC award
- Order of Brilliant Jade: ROC award for foreign recipients
