= Yoshitsugu Saitō =

Japanese general (1890–1944)

- 斎藤 義次
- Born: November 2, 1890; Miyagi, Japan
- Died: July 10, 1944 (aged 53); Saipan, Mariana Islands
- Education: Imperial Japanese Army Academy; Army Staff College
- Military career
- Allegiance: Empire of Japan
- Branch: Imperial Japanese Army
- Service years: 1912–1944
- Rank: Lieutenant General
- Units: IJA 5th Division; Kwantung Army
- Commands: IJA 43rd Division
- Conflicts: World War II; Second Sino-Japanese War; Pacific War; Battle of Saipan ‡‡

Yoshitsugu Saitō (斎藤 義次, Saitō Yoshitsugu; 2 November 1890 – 10 July 1944) was a lieutenant general in the Imperial Japanese Army during World War II. He commanded Japanese forces during the Battle of Saipan and committed seppuku during the battle.

== Biography ==
A native of Miyagi Prefecture, Saitō attended military preparatory schools and graduated from the 24th class of the Imperial Japanese Army Academy in 1912 as a cavalryman. He graduated from the 36th class of the Army Staff College in 1924. He rose steadily through the ranks with various cavalry regiments.

In 1938, he became Chief of Staff of the IJA 5th Division, and was promoted to major general the following year when he was reassigned to the Kwantung Army as chief of cavalry operations. He became a lieutenant general in 1942.

In April 1944, Saitō was appointed commander of the IJA 43rd Division at the time of its deployment to Saipan. As Japan had lost control of the sea lanes by this time in the Pacific War, the division suffered heavy casualties due to submarine attacks on its transports during the move. Saitō was overall commander of all Japanese forces on Saipan. Admiral Chuichi Nagumo, commander of the Central Pacific Area Fleet was also on the island, and was consulted frequently by Saitō.

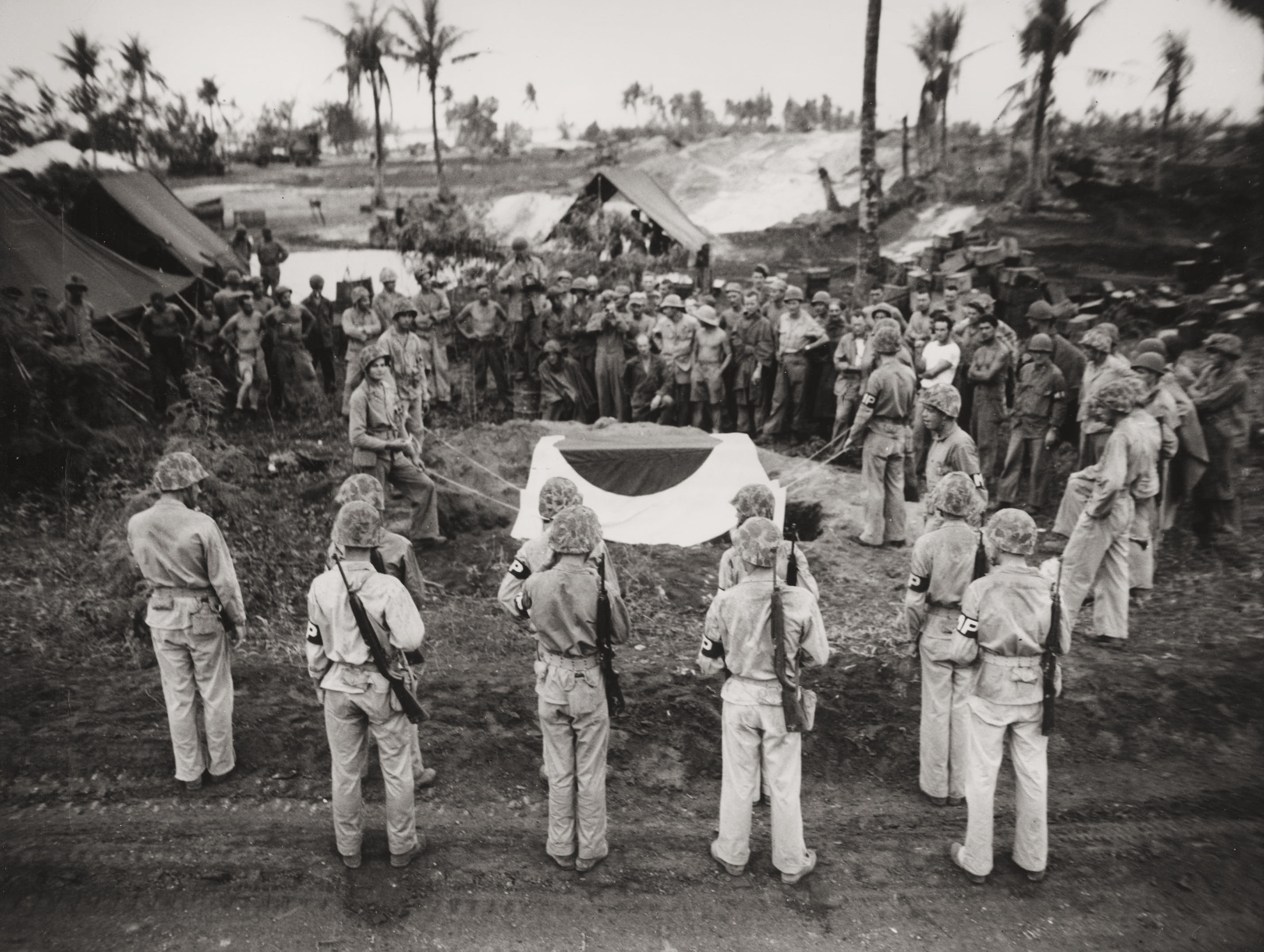
Funeral of Yoshitsugu Saitō by American military personnel, Saipan, 1944

The Battle of Saipan began on 15 June 1944. Without possibility of resupply, the situation was hopeless for the defenders, but Saito was determined to fight to the last man, as he was aware that the fall of Saipan would place the Japanese archipelago within range of American strategic bombers. The Japanese used the many caves in the volcanic landscape to delay the attackers, by hiding during the day and making sorties at night. The Americans gradually developed tactics for clearing the caves by using flamethrower teams supported by artillery and machine guns. On July 6, he called for a gyokusai saying roughly "Whether we attack or whether we stay where we are, there is only death. However, in death there is life. I will advance with you to deliver another blow to the American devils and leave my bones on Saipan as a fortress of the Pacific". By 7 July, the Japanese had nowhere to retreat. Over Nagumo's objections, Saito made plans for a final suicidal banzai charge. On the fate of the remaining civilians on the island, Saitō said, "There is no longer any distinction between civilians and troops. It would be better for them to join in the attack with bamboo spears than be captured." At approximately 16:15 on 9 July, American commander in chief Admiral Turner announced that Saipan was officially secured. Saitō, wanting to avoid capture and dishonor, committed seppuku in a cave at dawn on 10 July, with his adjutant shooting him in the head after he had disemboweled himself. Saitō was given a funeral with military honors by his American counterpart Holland Smith.

== Sources ==
- Denfeld, D. Colt (1997). Hold the Marianas: The Japanese Defense of the Mariana Islands. White Mane Pub. ISBN 1-57249-014-4.
- Dupuy, Trevor N. (1992). Encyclopedia of Military Biography. I B Tauris & Co Ltd. ISBN 1-85043-569-3.
- Fuller, Richard (1992). Shokan: Hirohito's Samurai. London: Arms and Armor. ISBN 1-85409-151-4.
- Toland, John (1970). The Rising Sun: The Decline and Fall of the Japanese Empire 1936-1945. Random House. ISBN 0-8129-6858-1.
