= Ichirō Banzai =

Japanese general

- 坂西 一良
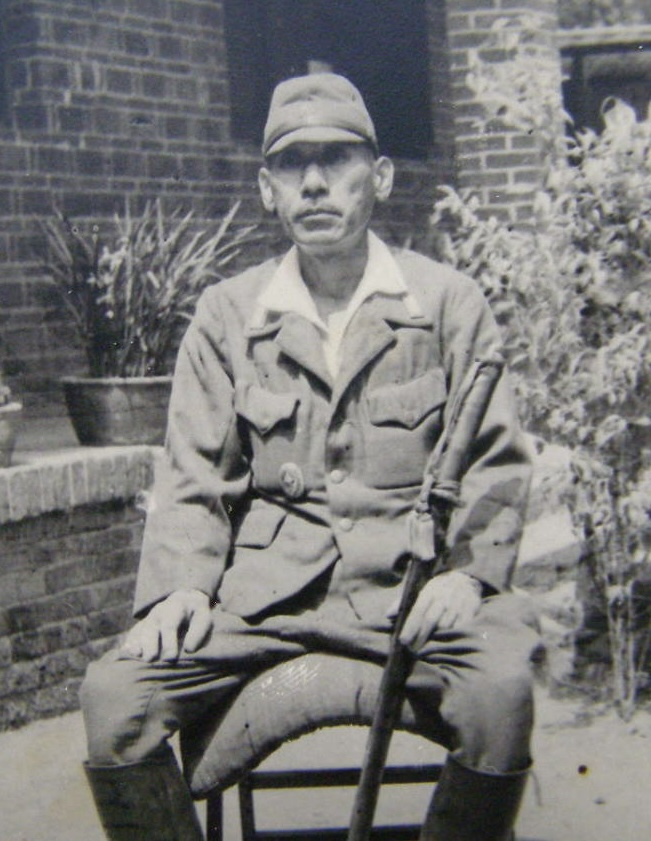
- Born: January 26, 1891; Hino, Tottori, Japan
- Died: September 16, 1945 (aged 54); Shanghai, China
- Military career
- Allegiance: Empire of Japan
- Branch: Imperial Japanese Army
- Service years: 1911–1945
- Rank: Lieutenant General
- Commands: Army Technical Bureau

Ichirō Banzai (坂西 一良, Banzai Ichirō; January 26, 1891 – September 16, 1945) (Note: Some Chinese sources claim he died on September 6, 1945, but Japanese sources claim his date of death as being September 16, 1946, aged 55.) was a lieutenant general in the Imperial Japanese Army. He was involved in the Pacific War and the Second Sino-Japanese War. He was a recipient of the Order of the Rising Sun, first class, large cordon.

He served as the Japanese military attaché in Germany on several occasions, and represented the interests of the Imperial Japanese Army in Berlin in the early part of World War II, from 1940 to 1943, when he returned to Japan. He later commanded a division and a corps in China during Operation Ichi-Go, and died in Shanghai shortly after the war ended.

== Life ==
=== Early life ===
Ichirō Banzai was born on January 26, 1891, in Kurosaki village in what was later the city of Hino, Tottori. He was the son of Inada Kiyoaki, a third-class combat medic in the Imperial Japanese Army. He was later adopted by Lieutenant General Banzai Rihachirō, whom he assumed the surname of. He attended Yonago Middle School (now Yonago Higher School), Osaka Army Youth School, and the Army Youth School, from which he graduated from in 1911.

=== Military career ===
In May 1919, Banzai worked in the Imperial Japanese Army General Staff Office (German class). He served as a member of the General Staff and as a military attaché to Germany. From February 1923 to June 1926, he was attached to the Japanese Embassy in Berlin. After returning to Japan, he served as an instructor at the Imperial Japanese Army Academy, as well as a member of the General Staff. He was assigned to the Inspectorate General of Military Training. From February 1932 to March 1934, he returned to Germany again as a military attaché.

After returning to Japan, Banzai was assigned to the Imperial Japanese Army Weapons Factory. In August 1934, he was promoted to colonel and served as the leader of the investigation squad of the Ministry of the Army. He was a member of the General Staff of both the Imperial Japanese Army and the Kwantung Army (Chief of the First Section). He was the commander of the 59th Infantry Company. In July 1938, he was promoted to the rank of major general. He continued to be an instructor and an officer at the IJAA, as well as being appointed commandant of the Army Infantry School. In November 1940, he was re-appointed to the Japanese embassy in Berlin. He left Tokyo in January of the following year and returned to Japan in January 1943. In March 1941, while he was in Germany, he was promoted to the rank of lieutenant general.

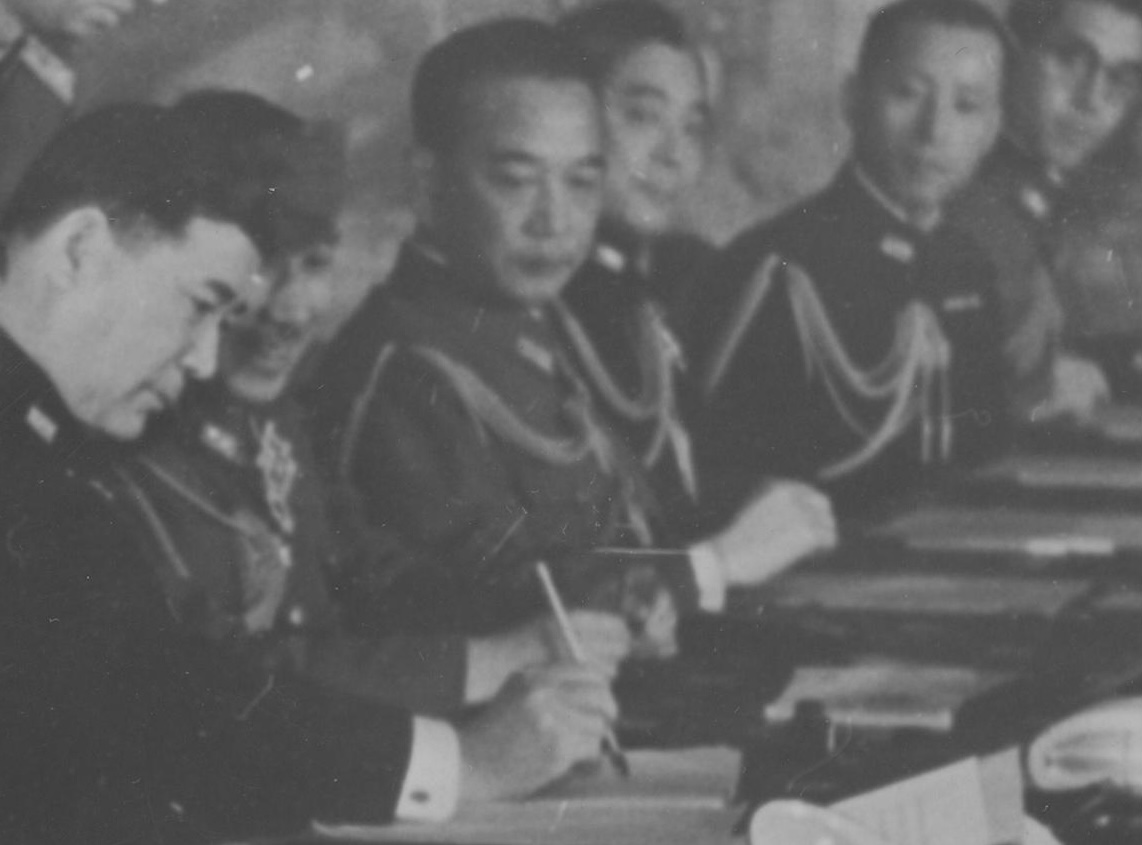
Lieutenant General Ichirō Banzai (second from left), 1942

He was part of the large Japanese military and naval delegation in Germany since Japan's entry into the Tripartite Pact, and was the chief representative of the Imperial Japanese Army in Berlin, while his naval counterpart was Vice Admiral Naokuni Nomura. Unlike Nomura, who maintained extensive contact with the German Naval High Command, Banzai had much less contact with his counterparts in the Army High Command and the Wehrmacht Operations Staff.

In February 1943, Banzai was appointed the commander of the IJA 35th Division, a garrison division which participated rear guard actions in the Taihang Mountains of China during the Second Sino-Japanese War. In April 1944, he was promoted to commander of the IJA 20th Army provide a garrison force for areas left under defended by the movement of troops further south in Operation Ichi-Go. From April 9, 1945 – June 7, 1945 it carried out the offensive in the Battle of West Hunan, the last major Japanese offensive of the Second Sino-Japanese War, during which time it suffered significant casualties. After the surrender of Japan, the IJA 20th Army surrendered to ROC General Wang Yaowu in a classroom on the second floor of the Science building of Hunan University in Changsha. However, the army was not immediately demobilized, but was rearmed by the Kuomintang government of the Republic of China and was assigned to the maintenance of public order until it was officially disbanded on July 15, 1946, at Hengyang, Hunan province. General Ichirō Banzai died in Shanghai less than a month after the surrender at Shanghai on September 16, 1945, at the age of 54.

== Court ranks ==
- September 15, 1941 – Junior 4th Rank
- October 1, 1943 – Senior 4th Rank

== Family ==
- Wife – Banzai Hayae, daughter of Banzai Rihachirō
- Brother – Inaba Mazasumi, IJA Lieutenant General
- Son-in-law – Kurokawa Nobuo, Army Major

== Books ==
- Rahn, Werner (1993). Japan and Germany, 1941—1943: No Common Objective, No Common Plans, No Basis of Trust. Vol. 46. Naval War College Review.
