= List of Japanese armored divisions =

List of Japanese armored divisions of the Imperial Japanese Army. During World War II, the IJA only organized four divisions, these were:

- IJA 1st Tank Division
- IJA 2nd Tank Division
- IJA 3rd Tank Division
- IJA 4th Tank Division

== See also ==
- List of air divisions of the Imperial Japanese Army
- List of Japanese infantry divisions
