= Edmond de Gaiffier d'Hestroy =

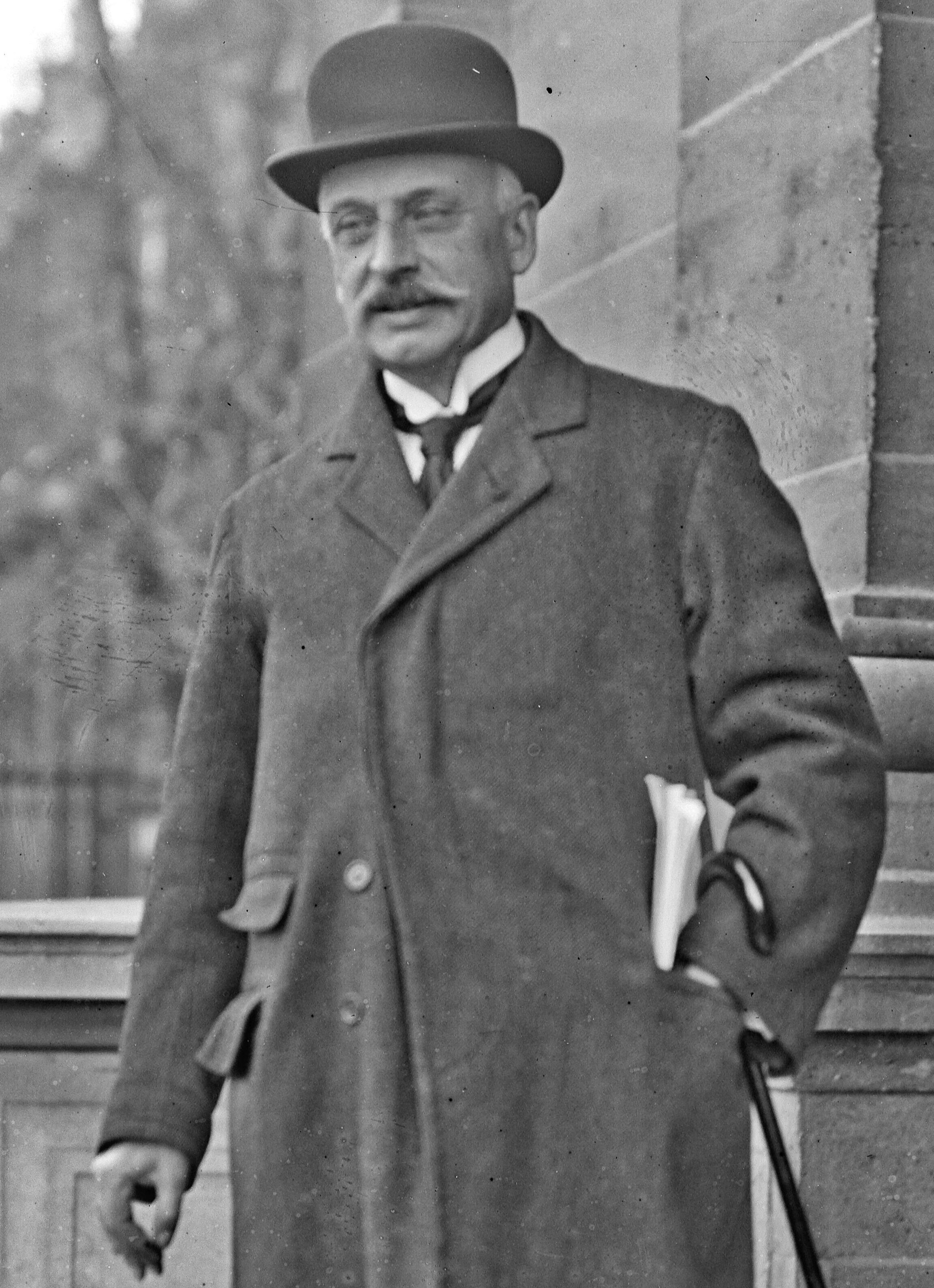
Edmond de Gaiffier d'Hestroy in 1923

Baron Edmond Ferdinand Felix Euchariste Marie Ghislain de Gaiffier d'Hestroy was a Belgian Ambassador. Born into a noble family, he served as ambassador in Paris, where he died in 1935.

== Honours ==
- 1931 : Knight Grand Cross in the Order of the Crown.
- Knight Grand Cross of the Order of Leopold II
- Grand Officer of the Order of Leopold.
- Knight Grand Cross of the Legion of Honour.
- Knight Grand Cross of the Order of Saint-Charles.
- Knight Grand Cross of the Order of the Star of Romania
- Knight Grand Cross of the Order of the Crown of Romania
- 1st Class of the Imperial Order of the Double Dragon.
- Commander of the Royal and Distinguished Spanish Order of Charles III
- Commander of the Military Order of Christ
- Commander of the Order of Our Lady of Conception of Vila Vicosa.
