= Twentieth Army (Japan) =

Japanese Twentieth Army
- Active: September 10, 1941 - July 15, 1946
- Country: Empire of Japan
- Branch: Imperial Japanese Army
- Type: Infantry
- Role: Corps
- Nickname(s): Sakura (桜, Cherry)

The Japanese 20th Army (第20軍, Dai-nijyū gun) was an army of the Imperial Japanese Army during the Second Sino-Japanese War.

== History ==
The Japanese 20th Army was formed on September 10, 1941 under the Kwantung Army in Heilongjiang province in northern Manchukuo as a garrison and border patrol force. It came under the administrative control of the Japanese First Area Army on July 4, 1942. On October 19, 1944, it was transferred to central China and came under the command of the Japanese Sixth Area Army to provide a garrison force for areas left under defended by the movement of troops further south in Operation Ichi-Go. From April 9, 1945 - June 7, 1945 it carried out the offensive in the Battle of West Hunan, the last major Japanese offensive of the Second Sino-Japanese War, during which time it suffered significant casualties. After the surrender of Japan, the 20th Army came under control of the Kuomintang government of the Republic of China and was assigned to the maintenance of public order until it was officially disbanded on July 15, 1946 at Hengyang, Hunan province.

== Historical controversy ==
Some of western works has a difficulty distinguishing Twentieth Army from Eleventh Army (Japan) belonging to the same Japanese Sixth Area Army group.

== List of Commanders ==
=== Commanding officer ===
	Name	From	To
1	Lieutenant General Kameji Seki	11 September 1941	11 March 1943
2	Lieutenant General Masaki Honda	11 March 1943	8 April 1944
3	Lieutenant General Ichirō Banzai	8 April 1944	September 1945

=== Chief of Staff ===
	Name	From	To
1	Major General Shiori Nagura	2 October 1941	1 July 1942
2	Major General Sadatake Nakayama	1 July 1942	7 February 1944
3	Major General Taro Kawame	7 February 1944	15 June 1945
4	Major General Yoji Ichikawa	15 June 1945	September 1945
