= Katharine Carl =

American artist (1865–1938)

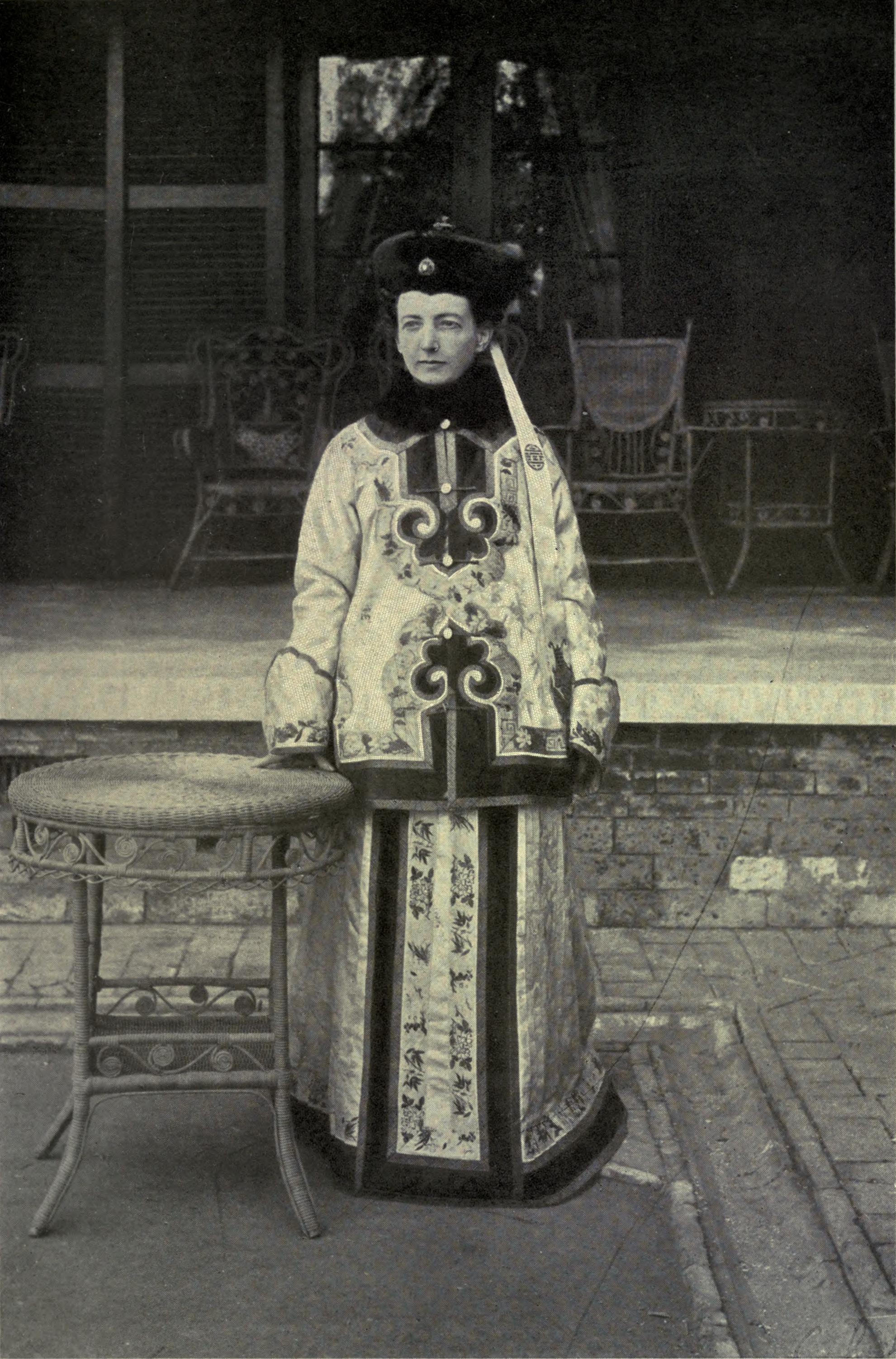
- Born: February 12, 1865; New Orleans, Louisiana
- Died: December 7, 1938 (aged 73); New York City
- Education: Gustave-Claude-Etienne Courtois and William-Adolphe Bouguereau; Tennessee State Female College (Master of Arts)
- Occupations: Painter and author
- Known for: Portraits of Empress Dowager Cixi

Katharine Augusta Carl (February 12, 1865 – December 7, 1938) (sometimes spelled Katherine Carl) was an American portrait painter and author. She made paintings of notable and royal people in the United States, Europe and Asia. She spent nine months in China in 1903 painting a portrait of the Empress Dowager Cixi for the St. Louis Exposition. On her return to America, she published a book about her experience, titled With the Empress Dowager of China.

== Early life ==
Katharine Augusta Carl was born in New Orleans, Louisiana, on February 12, 1865, the daughter of Francis Augustus Carl, Ph.D., LL.D. and Mary Breadon Carl. She had a brother named Francis A. Carl.

== Education ==
Carl graduated with a Master of Arts from the Tennessee State Female College in 1882. She studied art under Gustave-Claude-Etienne Courtois and William-Adolphe Bouguereau in Paris, and then exhibited her works in the Paris salons.

== Career ==
=== Overview ===
Carl painted portraits, including those made in 1892 of Mahomet Ali and Prince El Hadj in Algiers. She made portraits of Paul S. Reinsch and Sir Richard Dame.

Throughout her career, she traveled and painted in Europe and China many times. Carl exhibited her work at the Palace of Fine Arts and The Woman's Building at the 1893 World's Columbian Exposition in Chicago, Illinois. In London, she was a member of the Lyceum Club and the International Society of Women Painters. She was a member of the Société des Artistes Français of Paris, the International Jury of Fine Arts, and the International Jury of Applied Arts of the St. Louis Exposition.

=== China and Empress Dowager Cixi ===
Katharine Carl was contacted by Sarah Pike Conger, the wife of American Ambassador Edwin H. Conger with an offer to come to China in the summer of 1903 to paint a portrait of the Empress Dowager Cixi for the Chinese exhibit at the 1904 Louisiana Purchase Exposition. She spent a total of nine months in China and painted four portraits of the Empress Dowager, later recording her memories as the only western foreigner to live within the precincts of the Chinese imperial court in its last days in a book that was published in 1905.

I was obliged to follow, in every detail, centuries-old conventions. There could be no shadows and very little perspective, and everything must be painted in such full light as to lose all relief and picturesque effect. When I saw I must represent Her Majesty in such a conventional way as to make her unusually attractive personality banal, I was no longer filled with the ardent enthusiasm for my work with which I had begun it, and I had many a heartache and much inward rebellion before I settled on the inevitable.

— Katharine Carl, With the Empress Dowager of China

She stayed there under the provision that she did not share information about the Forbidden City. The Empress Dowager honored Carl with the Order of the Double Dragon and the Flaming Pearl.

Katharine Carl wrote of her time in China and provided a unique and intimate assessment of the Empress Dowager Cixi in her book With the Empress Dowager of China. (Note: Carl's experiences with the Dowager Empress are further detailed by Muriel Jernigan in Forbidden City. Jernigan lived in Peking until the 1912 revolution.) To her dismay, the press incorrectly reported that she had made unflattering remarks about the Empress.

Carl's brother, Francis, worked for Sir Robert Hart at the Imperial Chinese Maritime Customs Service. She apparently stayed at Hart's house at some point and was described by him as "very breezy - quite a tornado". While in China, she painted portraits of H.E. Tseng, former Lord Chamberlain to the Chinese Emperor, and former president of the Republic of China, Li Yuanhong.

== Personal life ==
She lived in New York City at 51 Washington Square and had a studio in the city.

In her later years she lived on East Seventy-Eighth Street in New York City. Carl died December 7, 1938, at Lenox Hill Hospital of burns she received when taking a bath at her apartment.

== In popular culture ==
Katharine Carl was portrayed by Sylvia in the 2006 Chinese television series Princess Der Ling.

== Gallery ==
Empress Dowager Cixi, 1904, was given to President Theodore Roosevelt, who had it added to the Smithsonian Institution collections

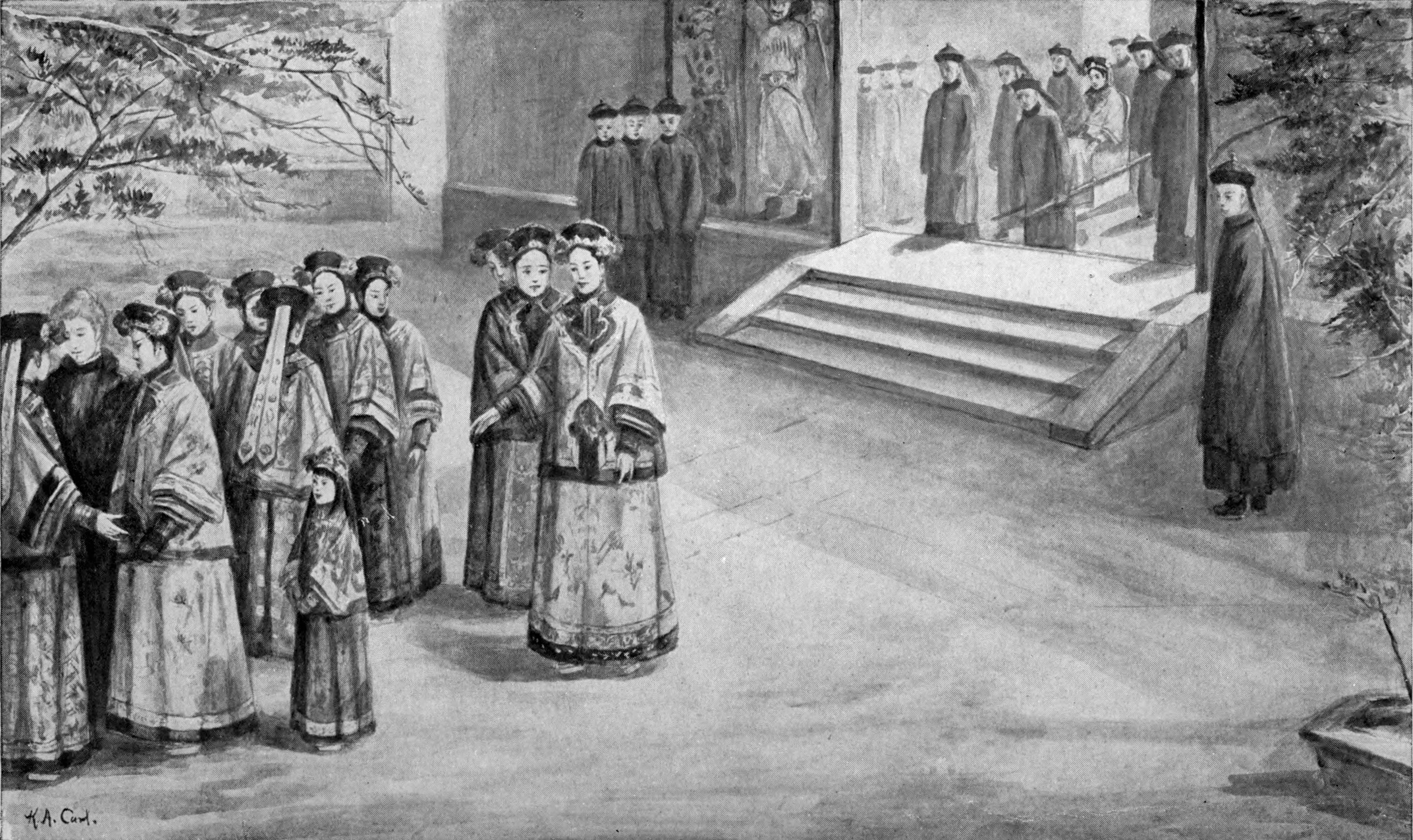
Court in the Winter Place, 1904

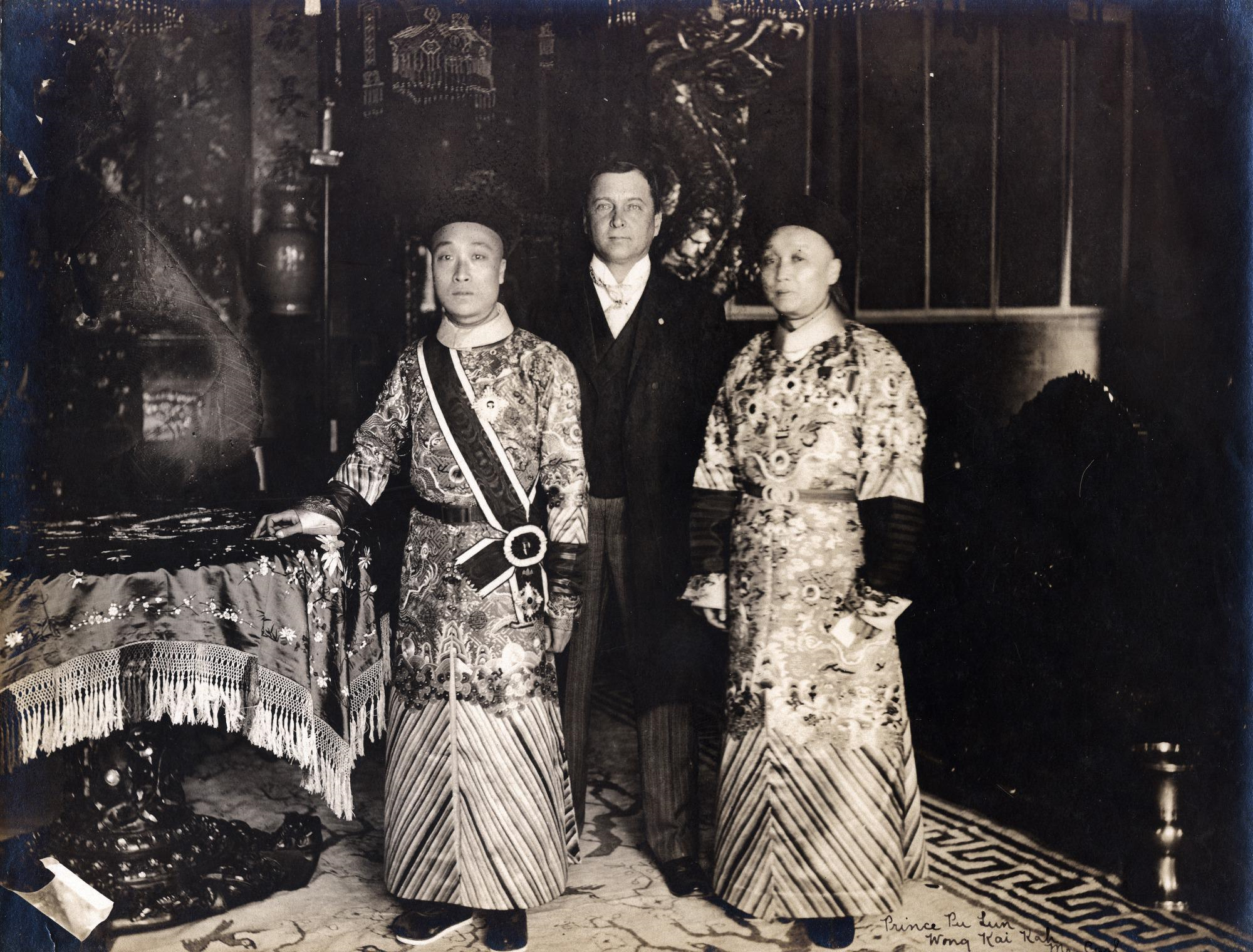
Prince Pu Lun, Francis A. Carl (Katharine Carl's brother), and Wong Kai Koh at the Chinese Reception at the 1904 World's Fair, where her painting was exhibited.

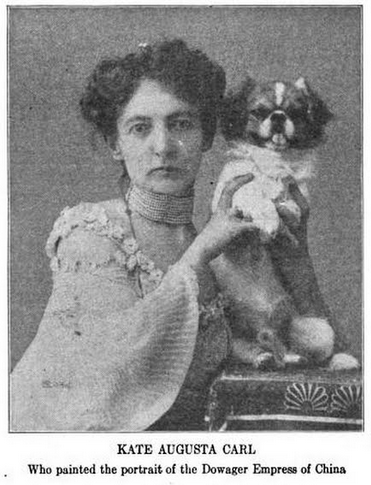
Kate Augusta Carl and a small dog, from a 1905 publication.

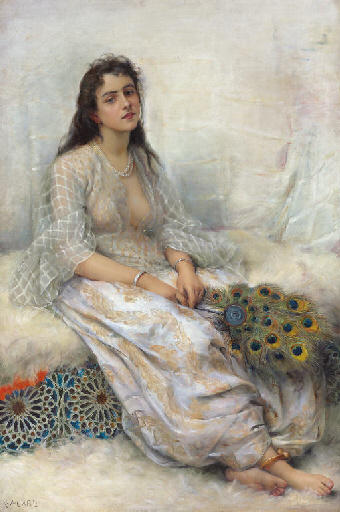
Katharine Carl, An Oriental Beauty, made in the 19th century
