= 3rd Tank Division (Imperial Japanese Army) =

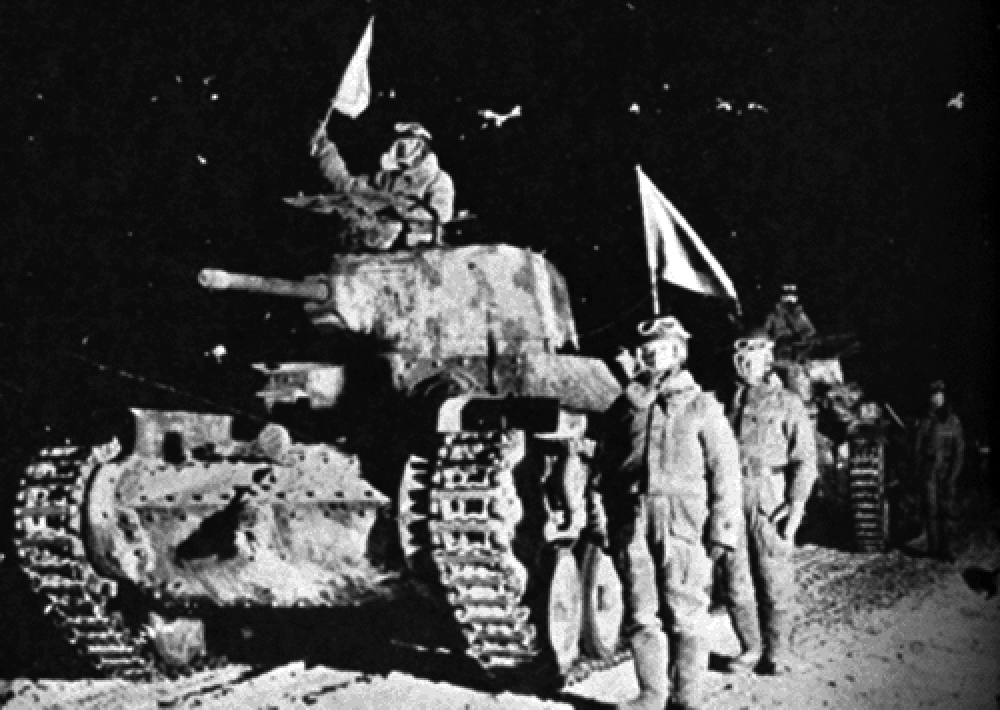
- A Type 97 Shinhoto Chi-Ha tank of the 3rd Tank Division during Operation Ichi-Go in northern China, December 1944
- Active: 1942–1945
- Country: Empire of Japan
- Branch: Imperial Japanese Army
- Type: Armored division
- Garrison/HQ: Tokyo, Japan
- Nickname: 滝 = Taki (Torrent)
- Engagements: Second Sino-Japanese War; World War II

The 3rd Tank Division (戦車第3師団, Sensha Dai-san Shidan), was one of four armored divisions of the Imperial Japanese Army in World War II.

== History ==
The 3rd Tank Division was raised in Inner Mongolia in 1942 as part of the Japanese Northern China Area Army under the overall aegis of the Mongolia Garrison Army.

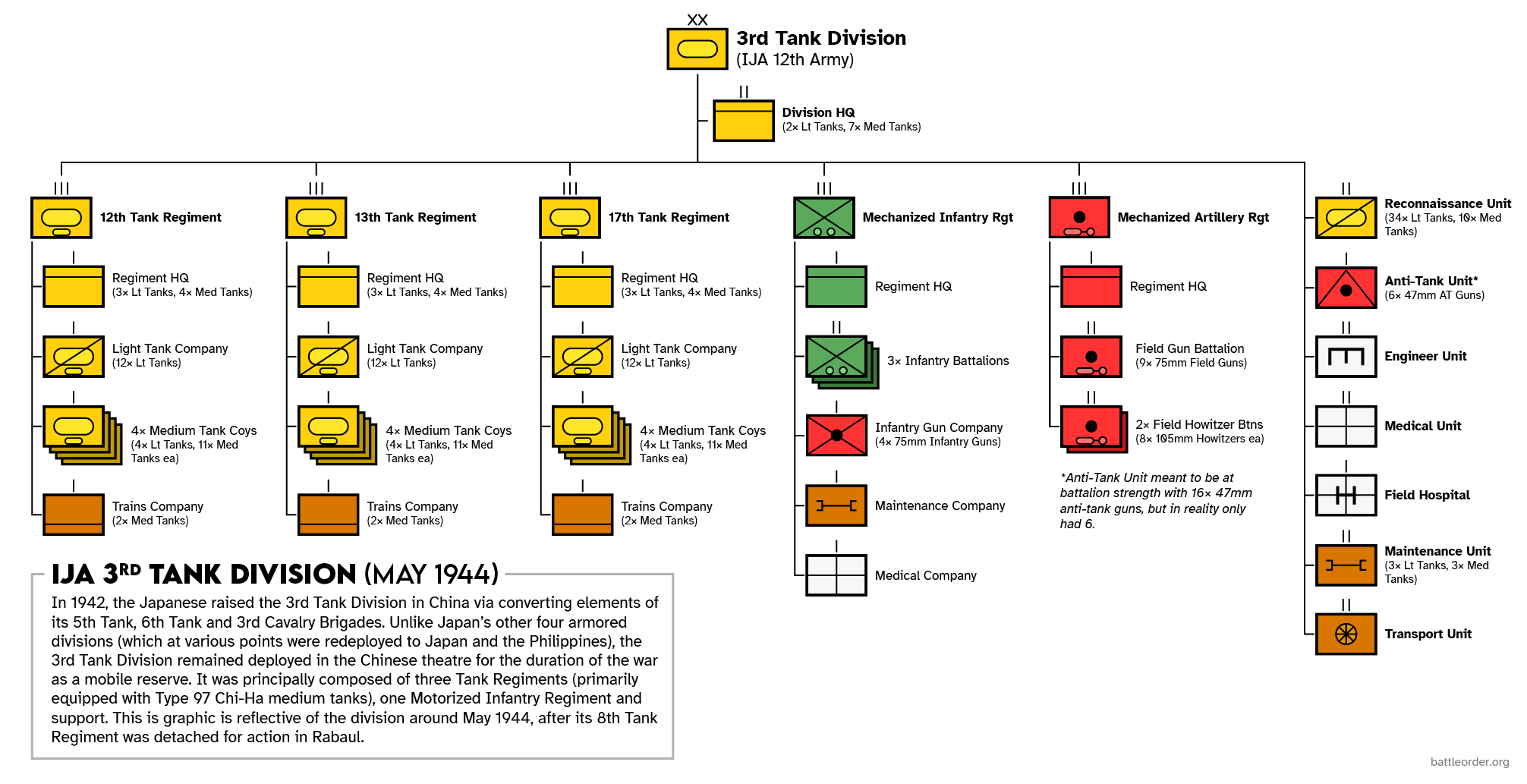
IJA 3rd Tank Division organization in mid-1944.

Initially tasked primarily with border patrol of Manchukuo's western frontier with the Soviet Union, from April 1944, it participated in Operation Ichi-Go in northern China against the National Revolutionary Army of the Republic of China. The two primary goals of Ichi-go were to open a land route to French Indochina, and capture air bases in southeast China from which American bombers were attacking the Japanese homeland and shipping.

The 3rd Tank Division’s IJA 8th Armored Regiment (formerly based in Mukden) was detached in June 1944, and transferred to the control of the Japanese Eighth Area Army in Rabaul.

The IJA 12th Armored Regiment, formerly based in Taiyuan, was withdrawn to bolster the defenses of Seoul in Korea towards the closing stages of the war and as part of the Japanese Seventeenth Area Army was in combat against the Soviet Red Army’s invasion of Manchuria.

The IJA 13th Armored Regiment, normally based in Hankou was withdrawn to Tianjin in 1944, and ended the war in Changsha. The IJA 17th Armored Regiment ended the war in Tianjin.

The 3rd Tank Division was officially demobilized in September 1945 with the rest of the Imperial Japanese Army.

== Commanding officer ==
	Name	From	To
1	Lieutenant General Isaku Nishihara	1 December 1942	7 January 1944
2	Lieutenant General Hideo Yamaji	7 January 1944	30 September 1945

== See also ==
- List of Japanese armored divisions
