= List of protected areas of Russia (Sakhalin Oblast) =

This list is of the protected areas or, more properly, Specially Protected Natural Areas (SPNAs) of the Russian Federation that are located in the federal subject of Sakhalin Oblast.

== List of SPNAs ==
As of May 2022, eighty-six SPNAs (Russian: особо охраняемые природные территории (ООПТ)) are listed on the ООПТ России database. In addition, Ilya Muromets Waterfall (Водопад Илья Муромец) is a prospective Natural Monument, White Cliffs (Белые скалы), Yuzhniy (Южный), and Yuzhno-Sakhalinskiy (Южно-Сахалинский) are former SPNAs, and Susunaiskiy Ridge was an unsuccessful National Park candidate.

SPNA	Image	Locality	Type	Import	Area	Comments	Map	Est.	Ref.
South Sakhalin Mud Volcano Южно-Сахалинский грязевой вулкан		Yuzhno-Sakhalinsk	Natural Monument	Regional	40 ha (99 acres)		List of protected areas of Russia (Sakhalin Oblast) is located in Sakhalin Oblast	1983	
Aniva White Acacia Grove Анивская роща белой акации		Yuzhno-Sakhalinsk	Natural Monument	Regional	0.5 ha (1.2 acres)		List of protected areas of Russia (Sakhalin Oblast) is located in Sakhalin Oblast	1980	
Verkhnebureinskiy Верхнебуреинский		Yuzhno-Sakhalinsk	Natural Monument	Regional	183.2 ha (453 acres)		List of protected areas of Russia (Sakhalin Oblast) is located in Sakhalin Oblast	1986	
Kurils Курильский		Yuzhno-Kurilsky	Zapovednik	Federal	65,365 ha (252.38 sq mi)	Kunashir, etc	List of protected areas of Russia (Sakhalin Oblast) is located in Sakhalin Oblast	1984	
Lesser Kurils Малые Курилы		Yuzhno-Kurilsky	Zakaznik	Federal	67,892 ha (262.13 sq mi)		List of protected areas of Russia (Sakhalin Oblast) is located in Sakhalin Oblast	1983	
South Kuril Relict Forest Южно-Курильский реликтовый лес		Yuzhno-Kurilsky	Natural Monument	Regional	0.5 ha (1.2 acres)	on Kunashir	List of protected areas of Russia (Sakhalin Oblast) is located in Sakhalin Oblast	1980	
Mendeleev Volcano Вулкан Менделеева		Yuzhno-Kurilsky	Natural Monument	Regional	2,242.2 ha (5,541 acres)	on Kunashir	List of protected areas of Russia (Sakhalin Oblast) is located in Sakhalin Oblast	1983	
Poronaysky Поронайский		Poronaysky	Zapovednik	Federal	56,694 ha (218.90 sq mi)	on Kunashir	List of protected areas of Russia (Sakhalin Oblast) is located in Sakhalin Oblast	1988	
Waterfall on the Nitui River Водопад на реке Нитуй		Poronaysky	Natural Monument	Regional	30 ha (74 acres)		List of protected areas of Russia (Sakhalin Oblast) is located in Sakhalin Oblast	1990	
Ammonites of the Pugachevka River Аммониты реки Пугачевки		Korsakovsky	Natural Monument	Regional	89.4 ha (221 acres)		List of protected areas of Russia (Sakhalin Oblast) is located in Sakhalin Oblast	1995	
Tunaycha Lake Озеро Тунайча		Korsakovsky	Natural Monument	Regional	22,075 ha (85.23 sq mi)		List of protected areas of Russia (Sakhalin Oblast) is located in Sakhalin Oblast	1977	
Cape Velikan Мыс Великан		Korsakovsky	Natural Monument	Regional	39.4 ha (97 acres)		List of protected areas of Russia (Sakhalin Oblast) is located in Sakhalin Oblast	1990	
Highlands of Mount Chekhov Высокогорья горы Чехова		Korsakovsky, Yuzhno-Sakhalinsk	Natural Monument	Regional	1,800 ha (4,400 acres)		List of protected areas of Russia (Sakhalin Oblast) is located in Sakhalin Oblast	1983	
Zhdanko Ridge Хребет Жданко		Makarovsky	Natural Monument	Regional	155 ha (380 acres)		List of protected areas of Russia (Sakhalin Oblast) is located in Sakhalin Oblast	1988	
Moneron Island Остров Монерон		Nevelsky	Nature Park	Regional	1,559 ha (3,850 acres)		List of protected areas of Russia (Sakhalin Oblast) is located in Sakhalin Oblast	1958	
Nogliksky Ногликский		Nogliksky	Zakaznik	Regional	66,206 ha (255.62 sq mi)		List of protected areas of Russia (Sakhalin Oblast) is located in Sakhalin Oblast	1998	
Aleksandrovsky Александровский		Alexandrovsk-Sakhalinsky	Zakaznik	Regional	24,600 ha (95 sq mi)		List of protected areas of Russia (Sakhalin Oblast) is located in Sakhalin Oblast	1980	
Dolinsky (Izyubrovy) Долинский (Изюбровый)		Dolinsky	Zakaznik	Regional	9,176 ha (35.43 sq mi)		List of protected areas of Russia (Sakhalin Oblast) is located in Sakhalin Oblast	1988	
Lake Dobretskoye Озеро Добрецкое		Dolinsky	Zakaznik	Regional	5,817.4 ha (22.461 sq mi)		List of protected areas of Russia (Sakhalin Oblast) is located in Sakhalin Oblast	1966	
Crater Bay Бухта Кратерная		Severo-Kurilsky	Zakaznik	Regional	20 ha (49 acres)	off Ushishir	List of protected areas of Russia (Sakhalin Oblast) is located in Sakhalin Oblast	1987	

== See also ==
- List of national parks of Russia
- List of zapovedniks of Russia
- Territory of Traditional Natural Resource Use
