= Soviet–Japanese War (disambiguation) =

Soviet-Japanese War may refer to:

- Soviet–Japanese border conflicts (1938–39)
  - Battle of Lake Khasan (1938)
  - Battles of Khalkhin Gol (1939)
- Soviet–Japanese War (1945)
  - Soviet invasion of Manchuria (1945) (also sometimes referred to as "Operation August Storm")

== See also ==
- Empire of Japan–Russian Empire relations (1855–1922)
  - Russo-Japanese War (1904–05)
- Japan–Soviet Union relations (1922–91)
- Japan–Russia relations (1991-present)
- Soviet–Japanese Basic Convention (1925)
- Soviet–Japanese Neutrality Pact (1941)
- Soviet–Japanese Joint Declaration of 1956
