= Tanfilyev Island =

Disputed island in the Kurils

Tanfiliev
Disputed island
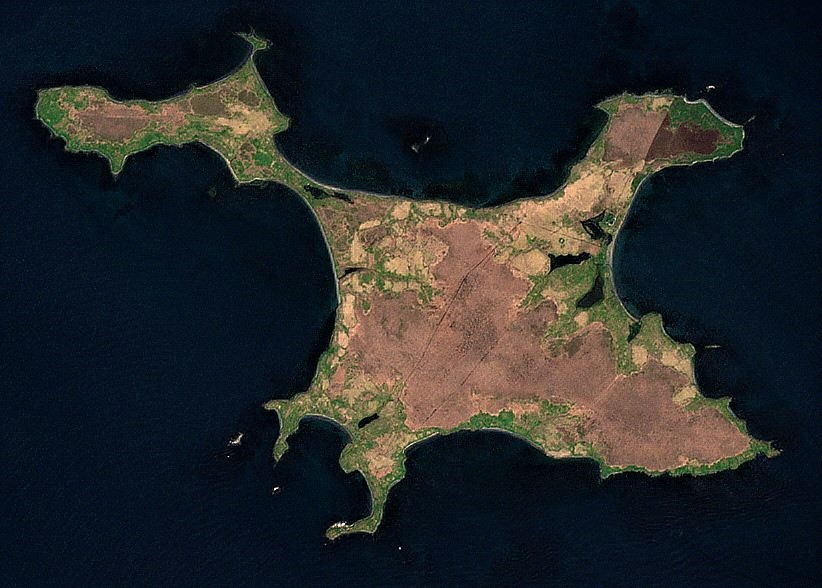
- 2016 Copernicus (ESA) satellite image of Tanfiliev

- Location within Hokkaido
- Other names: Russian: Танфильева; Japanese: 水晶島

Geography
- Location: Pacific Ocean
- Coordinates: 43°26′12″N 145°55′00″E
- Archipelago: Habomai Islands, Lesser Kuril Chain, Kuril Islands
- Area: 12.1 km^{2} (4.7 sq mi)
- Highest elevation: 16 m (52 ft)

Administration
- Russia
- Federal subject: Sakhalin Oblast
- District: Yuzhno-Kurilsky

Claimed by
- Japan
- Prefecture: Hokkaido
- Subprefecture: Nemuro

Demographics
- Population: 0

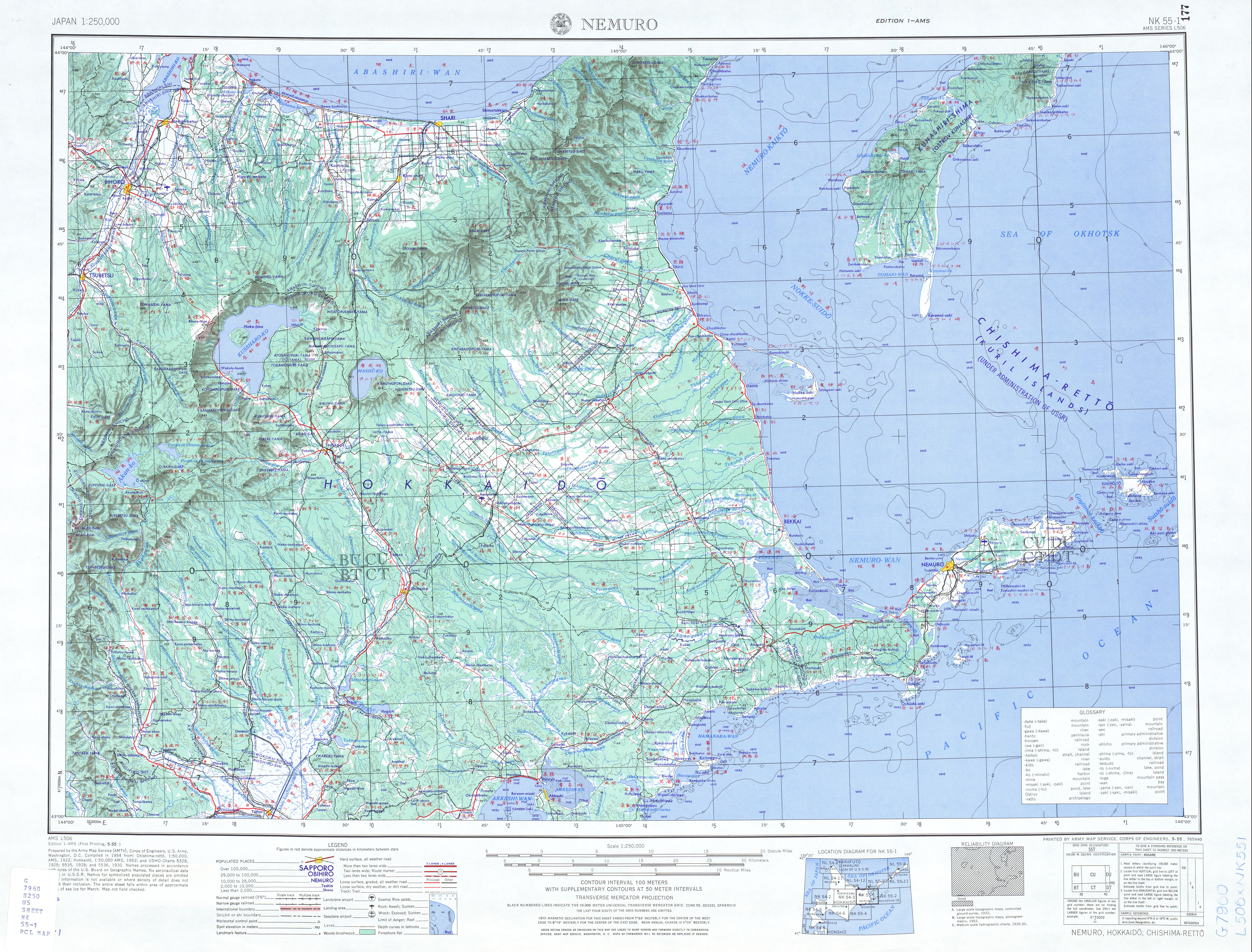
1954 US AMS map showing "Suishō-Tō" separated from Cape Nosappu on the Nemuro Peninsula by the "Goyōmai-kaikyō" or Soviet Strait

Tanfiliev (Russian: Танфильева, romanized: Tanfilyeva; Japanese: 水晶島, romanized: Suishō-tō) is an uninhabited island in the Habomai Islands, part of the Lesser Kuril Chain. It is administered by the Russian Federation as part of Yuzhno-Kurilsky District, Sakhalin Oblast. It is claimed by Japan, as part of Hokkaidō's Nemuro Subprefecture. The island and its surrounding waters form part of the Malye Kurily zakaznik or Lesser Kurils State Nature Preserve.

== Geography ==
The southernmost island in the Lesser Kuriles, Tanfiliev lies some 7.8 kilometres (4.8 mi) from Cape Nosappu at the eastern end of the Nemuro Peninsula. Extending 8 by 6 kilometres (5.0 mi × 3.7 mi), the island covers an area of 12.1 square kilometres (4.7 sq mi). Relatively low-lying, 16 metres (52 ft) at its highest point, the island has a number of short streams and lagoon lakes. Along the coast, with its capes and bays, there are grassy meadows. Tanfiliev lies within the "Lesser Kuril Ridge and Kunashir Island" Important Bird and Biodiversity Area, the island's flora and fauna protected as part of the Lesser Kurils Zakaznik.

== History ==
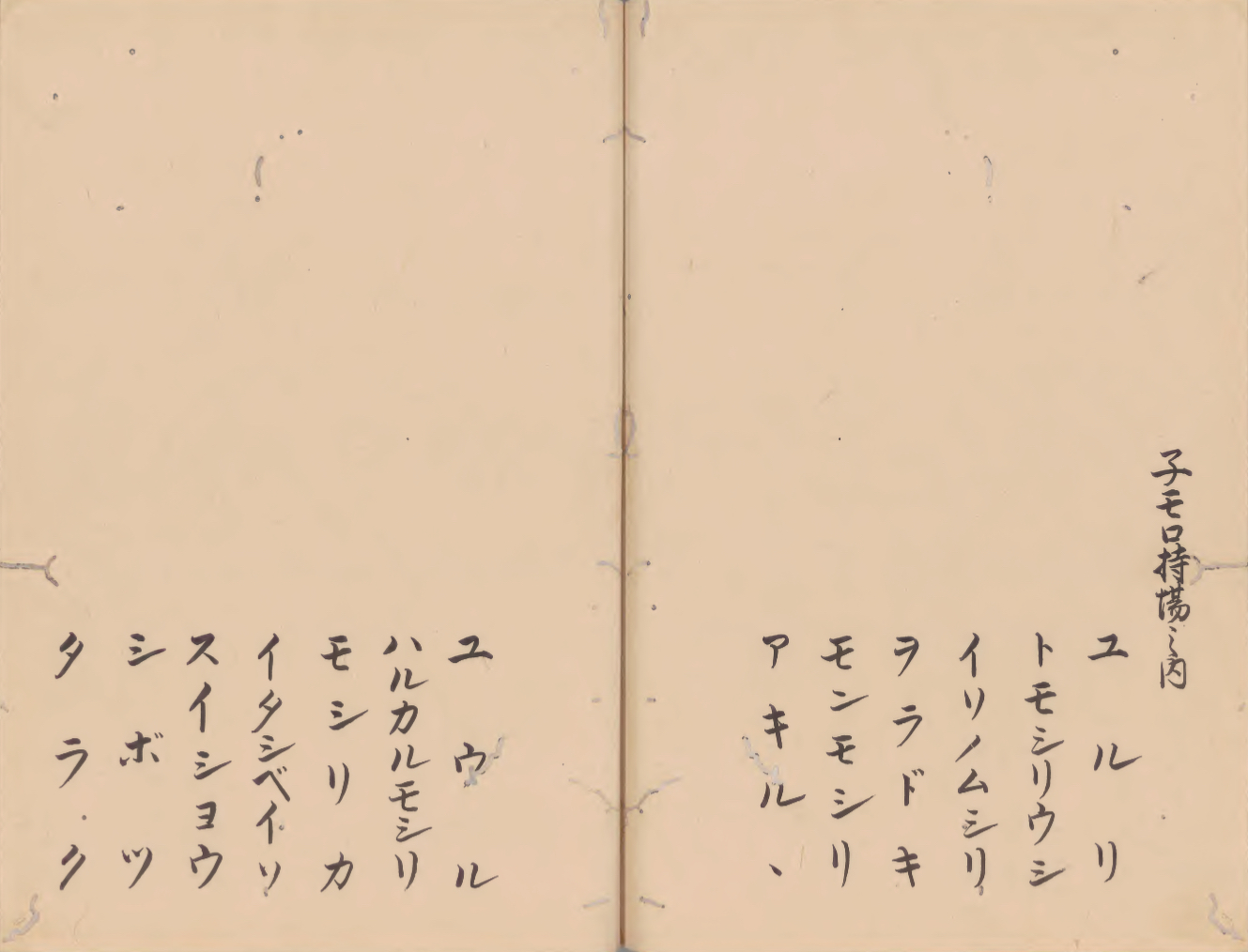
Suishō (「スイショウ」) (third column from the left) listed under Nemoro (子モロ) in the Tenpō gōchō of 1834

The Japanese name for the island, Suishō, is of Ainu origin. In the 1834 Tenpō gōchō or Village Registers of the Tenpō Era, Suishō is listed as a settlement of Nemoro. Visited by Matsuura Takeshirō and written about in his diaries, in the early Meiji period the island formed part of the village of Goyōmai [ja], later merged into Habomai. Before the Pacific War, most of the population were involved in the fishing industry; they were joined by migrant workers from the area of Niigata Prefecture and Toyama Prefecture each spring. Konbu (kelp) was the most important product, and there was also canning of salmon, trout, crabs, and shrimp. At the end of the war, the population stood at 986, in 154 households, along with 325 horses. Currently, the Habomai Islands as a whole are uninhabited, other than the stationing of Russian guards.

== See also ==
Media related to Tanfiliev Island at Wikimedia Commons

- List of protected areas of Russia (Sakhalin Oblast)
- Soviet–Japanese Joint Declaration of 1956
