= Starodubsky =

Set index of articles associated with the same name

Starodubsky (Russian: Стародубский; masculine), Starodubskaya (Стародубская; feminine), or Starodubskoye (Стародубское; neuter) is the name of several rural localities in Russia:

- Starodubskoye, Sakhalin Oblast, a selo in Dolinsky District of Sakhalin Oblast
- Starodubskoye, Stavropol Krai, a selo in Starodubsky Selsoviet of Budyonnovsky District of Stavropol Krai
