= Lesser Kurils Zakaznik =

Protected area in the Lesser Kuril Chain, Russia

- Малые Курилы
- IUCN category IV (habitat/species management area)
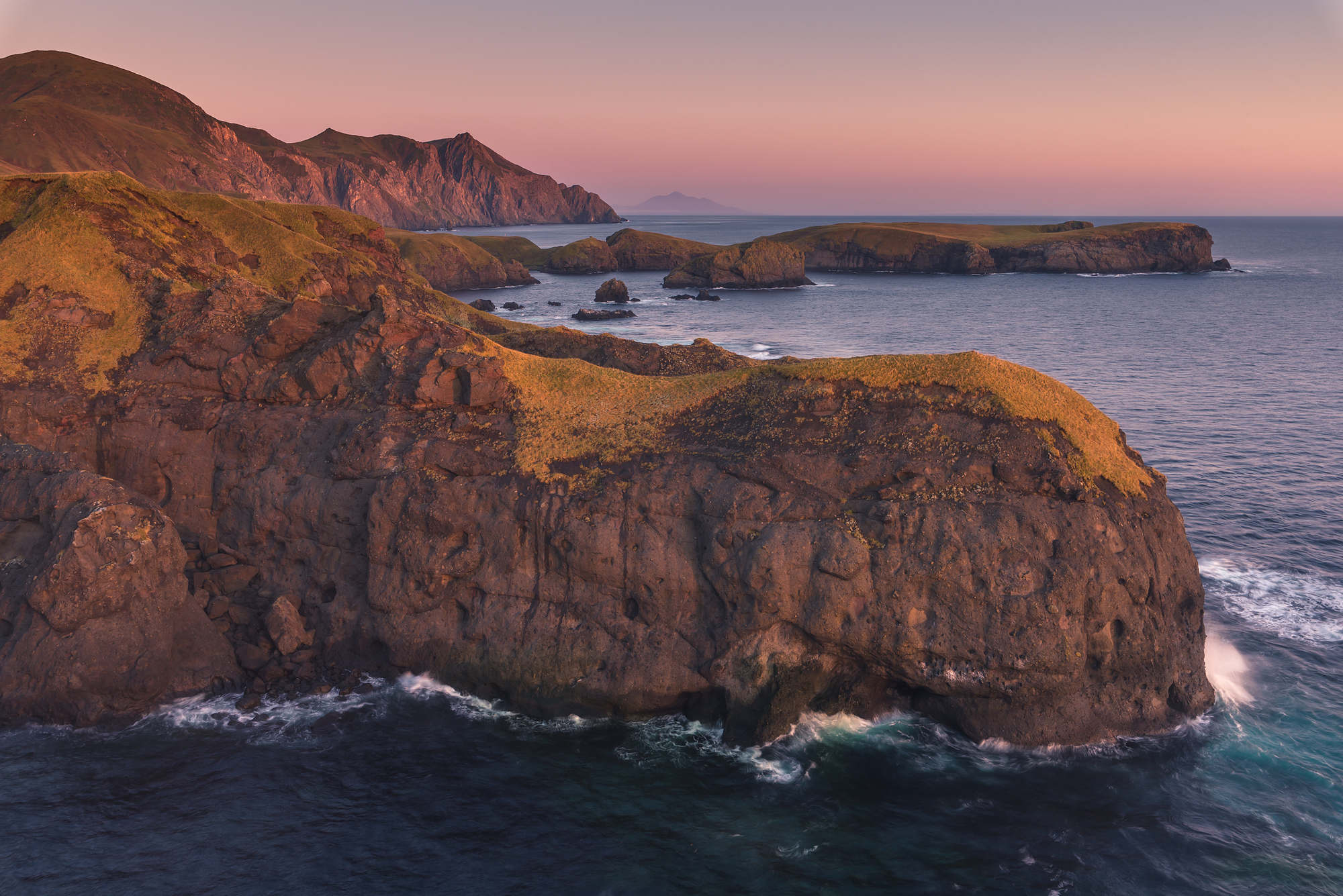
- Interactive map of Lesser Kurils Zakaznik
- Location: Yuzhno-Kurilsky District, Sakhalin Oblast, Russia
- Coordinates: 43°25′11″N 146°04′11″E
- Area: 678.92 km^{2} (262.13 sq mi)
- Established: 13 May 1983

Lesser Kurils Zakaznik (Russian: Малые Курилы) is a federal-level Zakaznik or "State Nature Preserve" in the disputed Lesser Kuril Chain, administered by Sakhalin Oblast, Russia, but also formally part of Nemuro Subprefecture, Japan. The preserve was established in 1983, in accordance with the Japan-Soviet Joint Communiqué of 10 October 1973. The protected area of 678.92 square kilometres (262.13 sq mi) includes a marine area of 409 square kilometres (158 sq mi).

== Description ==
The Zakaznik encompasses areas of Shikotan in addition to Anuchina, Polonsky Island, Tanfiliev Island, Yuri, and Zelyony in the Habomai Islands. The protected marine zone extends to one nautical mile from the coast. The Zakaznik helps conserve marine mammals (including cetaceans, Steller sea lions (Eumetopias jubatus), Western Pacific harbor seals (Phoca vitulina stejnegeri), and sea otters (Enhydra lutris), as well as the Shikotan vole (Clethrionomys rex), red-crowned crane (Grus japonensis), colonies of seabirds, wintering waterfowl, and local plant communities.

== See also ==
- List of protected areas of Russia (Sakhalin Oblast)
