= Japan–Russia relations =

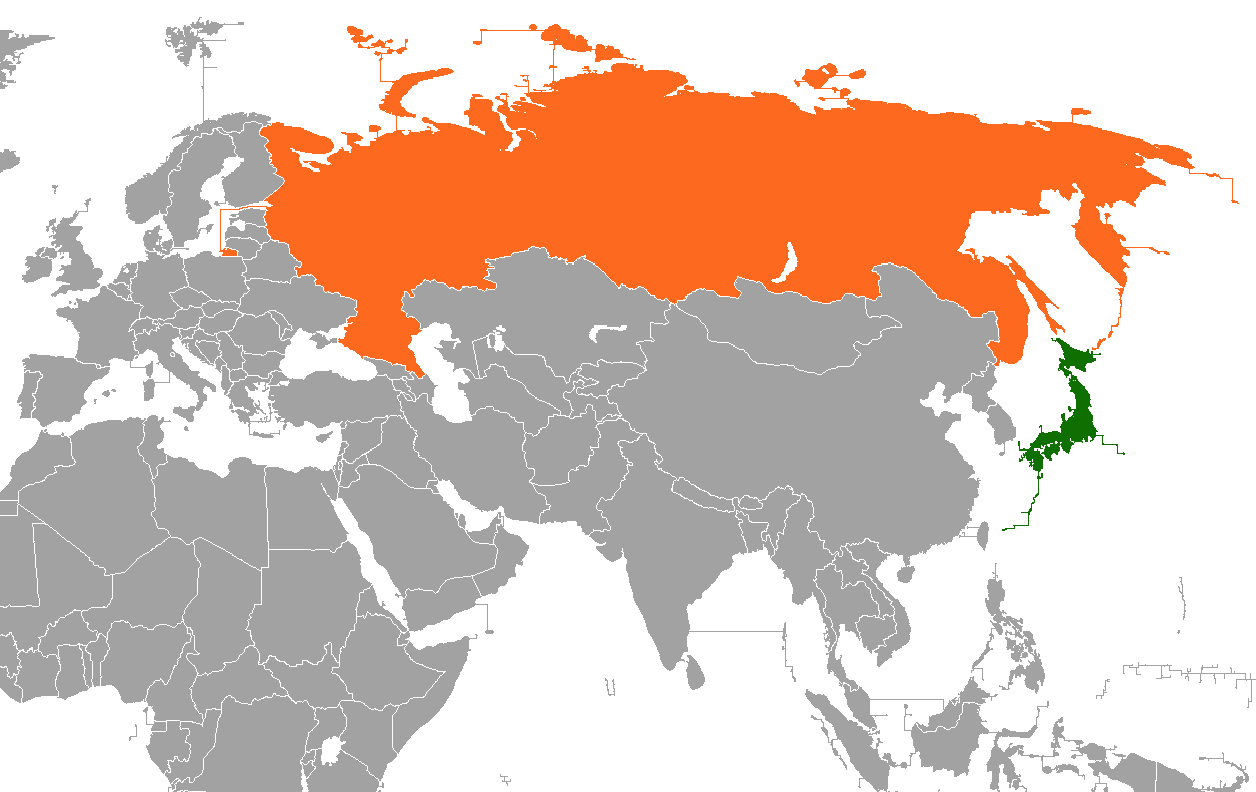
- Japan: Russia

Diplomatic mission
- Embassy of Japan, Moscow: Embassy of Russia, Tokyo

Envoy
- Japanese Ambassador to Russia Toyohisa Kozuki: Ambassador to Japan Nikolay Stanislavovich Nozdrev

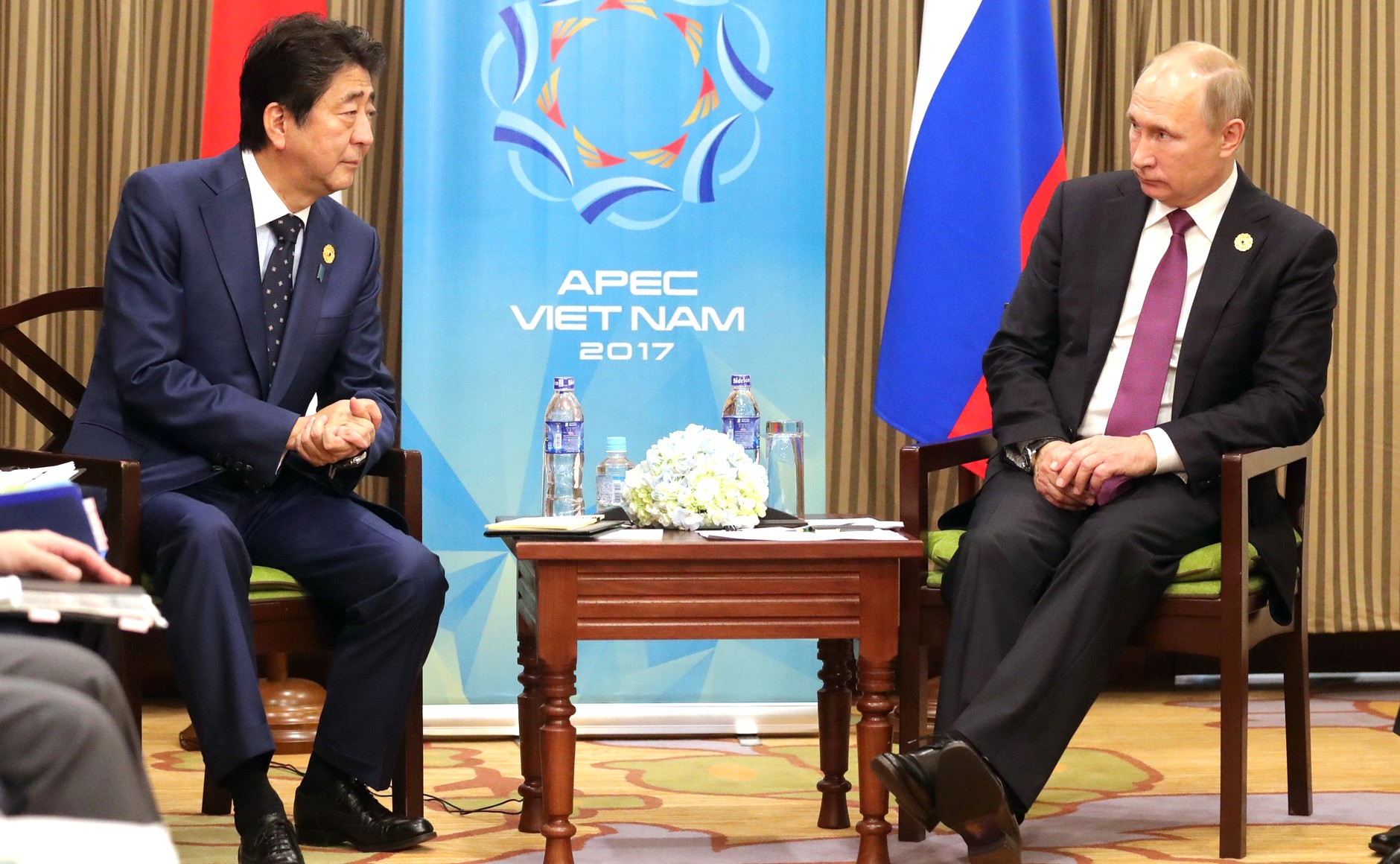
Japanese prime minister Shinzō Abe (left) and Russian president Vladimir Putin (right) at APEC Vietnam 2017

Japan–Russia relations are the modern bilateral relations between Japan and Russia, following Empire of Japan–Russian Empire relations (1855–1917) and Japan–Soviet Union relations (1917–1991). Relations between the two nations have been tepid at the political level since the end of World War II, and both countries have intensified sanctions against each other after the Russian invasion of Ukraine.

Historically, the two countries had cordial relations until a clash of territorial ambitions in Manchuria led to the Russo–Japanese War of 1904, which ended in a Japanese victory that in turn weakened the House of Romanov's reign in Russia. Japan later intervened in the Russian Civil War (1918–1922), sending troops to the Russian Far East and Siberia, followed by border conflicts between the two countries throughout the 1930s. The two signed a non-aggression pact in 1941, but the Soviet government nevertheless declared war on Japan in 1945 by invading Manchukuo and seizing the Kuril Islands. The two countries ended their formal state of war with the Soviet–Japanese Joint Declaration of 1956, but have still not resolved the Kuril Islands dispute.

Following the 2022 Russian invasion of Ukraine, relations between the two countries became tense after Japan imposed sanctions against Russia, which then placed Japan on its list of "unfriendly" countries. Japan and Russia each expelled a number of diplomats, and Russia halted peace negotiations with Japan that included talks on resolving the Kuril Islands dispute. Japanese public has an overwhelmingly negative opinion of Russia.

== History ==
Russian navigator Adam Laxman was sent by Catherine the Great to return Japanese castaway Daikokuya Kōdayū to Japan. Russian diplomat Nikolai Rezanov was commissioned by Alexander I as Russian ambassador to Japan to conclude a commercial treaty, but his efforts were thwarted by the Japanese government.

=== Tsarist era (1855–1917) ===
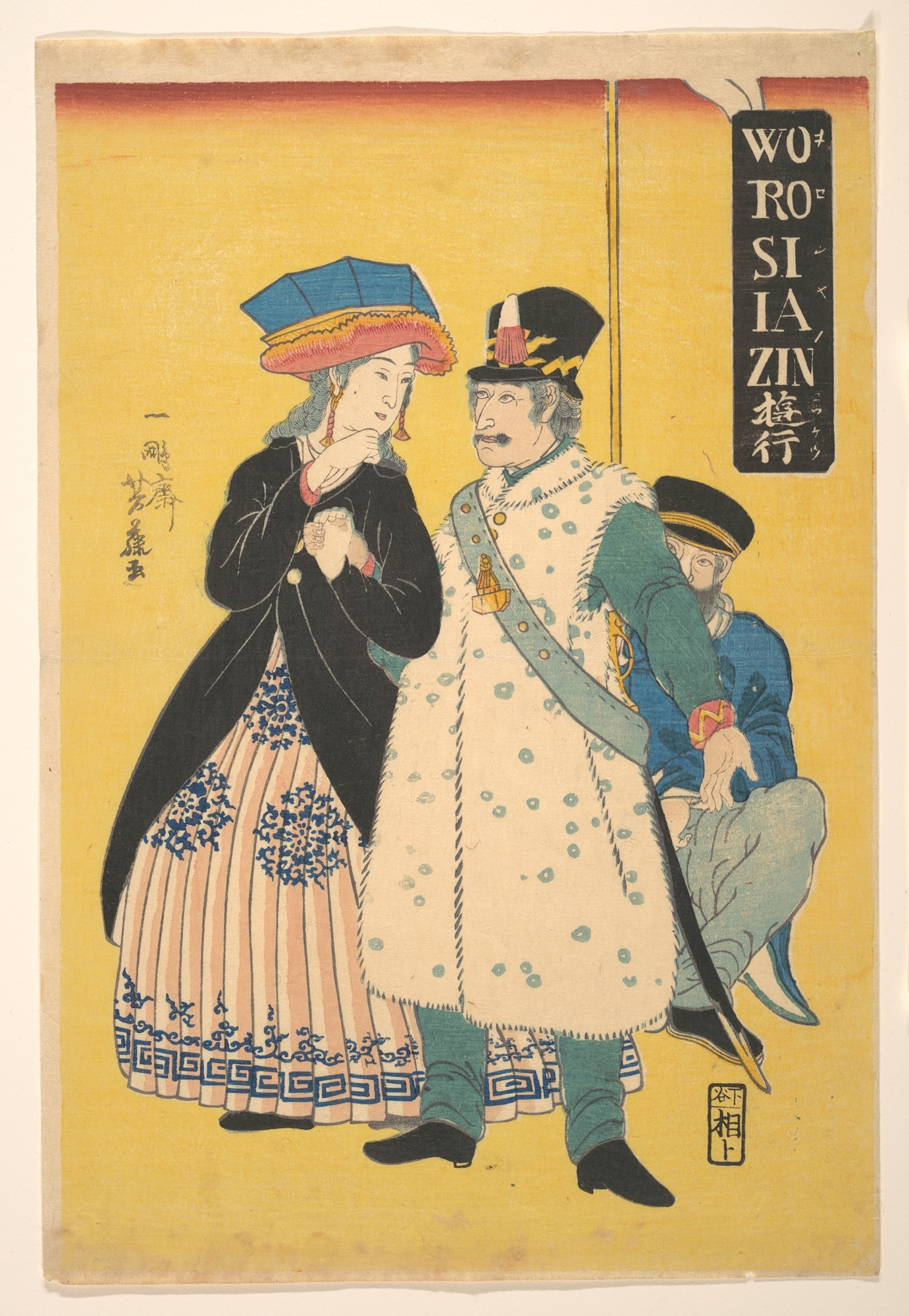
Russian soldier and his family in Yokohama, 1861

Diplomatic and commercial relations between the two empires were established from 1855 onwards. Japan and Russia participated in the suppression of the Boxer Rebellion in China. Relations were minimal before 1855, mostly friendly from 1855 to the early 1890s, then turned hostile over the status of Korea. The two nations contested control of Manchuria and Korea, leading to Japanese victory in the Russo-Japanese War of 1904–1905. Russia began construction of the Trans-Siberian railroad, which for the first time gave it easy access to Siberia and adjacent areas. Meanwhile, Japan's defeat of China in 1894-95 Sino-Japanese war demonstrated Japan's military modernization, and its quest for control of Korea. Russia and Japan both were making inroads into Chinese territories, especially in Manchuria, however were blocked from moving south of Manchuria by the strength of British and American resistance. Relations were good 1905–1917, as the two countries divided up Manchuria and Outer Mongolia.

=== Soviet era (1917–1991) ===
1939 map of Japanese Hokushin-ron plans for a potential attack on the Soviet Union. Dates indicate the year that Japan gained control of the territory.

Relations between the Communist takeover in 1917 and the collapse of Communism in 1991 tended to be hostile. Japan had sent troops to counter the Bolshevik presence in Russia's Far East during the Russian Civil War, but left without any gains.

Relations were tense in the 1930s, as Japan took full control of Manchuria in 1931 and made war on China in 1937. Moscow favored China. The Russians defeated Japan at the bloody Nomonhan Incident in 1939. Japanese leaders decided to avoid any war with the USSR and instead turned south against Britain, the Netherlands and the United States. As a result, Japan and Russia signed a non-aggression agreement on April 13, 1941.

According to reports, some of the victims of Unit 731, a covert biological research united which conducted human experimentation, were Russians. Japan has yet to acknowledge the existence of the unit, as well as the Soviet victims.

The USSR declared war on Japan in August 1945 and invaded Japanese-controlled areas of Korea and Manchuria, swiftly capturing the defenders. Moscow kept POWs after the war for years, using them for forced labor, a concern that heightened Japan's support of the anti-Soviet side of the Cold War.

The U.S. had full control of the Occupation of Japan, to Moscow's annoyance. In response Moscow refused to sign the 1951 peace treaty. Therefore, the state of war between the Soviet Union and Japan technically existed until 1956, when it was ended by the Soviet–Japanese Joint Declaration of 1956. A formal peace treaty still has not been signed. The key stumbling block to improving relations between the Soviet Union and Japan in the post-war period has been the territorial dispute over the Kurils, which are known as the Northern Territories in Japan.

After 1975, the Soviet Union began openly to warn that a Japanese peace treaty with China would jeopardize Soviet–Japan relations. The signing of the Sino-Japanese peace treaty in mid-1978 was a major setback to Japanese-Soviet relations. Moscow saw it as placing Tokyo with Washington and Beijing firmly in the anti-Soviet camp. Soviet actions served only to alarm and alienate the Japanese side. The 1980s Soviet military buildup in the Pacific was a case in point.

The 1980s saw a decided hardening in Japanese attitudes toward the Soviet Union. Japan was pressed by the United States to do more to check the expansion of Soviet power in the developing world following the December 1979 Soviet invasion of Afghanistan. It responded by cutting off contacts beneficial to the Soviet regime and providing assistance to "front line" states, such as Pakistan and Thailand. Under Prime Minister Yasuhiro Nakasone, Japan worked hard to demonstrate a close identity of views with the Reagan administration on the "Soviet threat". Japan steadily built up its military forces, welcomed increases in United States forces in Japan and the western Pacific, and pledged close cooperation to deal with the danger posed by Soviet power.

This economic cooperation was interrupted by Japan's decision in 1980 to participate in sanctions against the Soviet Union for its invasion of Afghanistan and by its actions to hold in abeyance a number of projects being negotiated, to ban the export of some high-technology items, and to suspend Siberian development loans. Subsequently, Japanese interest in economic cooperation with the Soviet Union waned as Tokyo found alternative suppliers and remained uncertain about the economic viability and political stability of the Soviet Union under Gorbachev. Japan-Soviet trade in 1988 was valued at nearly US$6 billion.

Although public and media opinion remained skeptical of the danger to Japan posed by Soviet forces in Asia, there was strong opposition in Japan to Moscow's refusal to accede to Japan's claims to the Northern Territories, known to the Japanese as Etorofu and Kunashiri, at the southern end of the Kuril Island chain, and the smaller island of Shikotan and the Habomai Islands, northeast of Hokkaidō, which were seized by the Soviets in the last days of World War II. The stationing of Soviet military forces on the islands gave tangible proof of the Soviet threat, and provocative maneuvers by Soviet air and naval forces in Japanese-claimed territory served to reinforce Japanese official policy of close identification with a firm United States-backed posture against Soviet power. In 1979, the Japanese government specifically protested a buildup in Soviet forces in Etorofu, Kunashiri, and Shikotan.

The advent of the Mikhail Gorbachev regime in Moscow in 1985 saw a replacement of hard-line Soviet government diplomats who were expert in Asian affairs with more flexible spokespersons calling for greater contact with Japan. Gorbachev took the lead in promising new initiatives in Asia, but the substance of Soviet policy changed more slowly. Gorbachev was consistently uncompromising regarding the Northern Territories. Furthermore, Soviet forces in the western Pacific still seemed focused on and threatening to Japan, and Soviet economic troubles and lack of foreign exchange made prospects for Japan-Soviet Union economic relations appear poor. By 1990, Japan appeared to be the least enthusiastic of the major Western-aligned developed countries in encouraging greater contacts with and assistance to the Soviet Union.

Changes in Soviet policy carried out under Gorbachev beginning in the mid-1980s, including attempts at domestic reform and the pursuit of détente with the United States and Western Europe, elicited generally positive Japanese interest, but the Japanese government held that Moscow had not changed its policies on issues vital to Japan. The government stated that it would not conduct normal relations with the Soviet Union until Moscow returned the Northern Territories. The government and Japanese business leaders stated further that Japanese trade with and investment in the Soviet Union would not grow appreciably until the Northern Territories issue has been resolved.

=== Early post-Soviet era (1991–1999) ===
By the late 1990s, the Russian leadership began to pivot from West to East, considering improving relations with Japan as part of this effort, and viewed Prime Minister Ryutaro Hashimoto's position as an opportunity. President Boris Yeltsin met with Prime Minister Hashimoto in Krasnoyarsk on 1 November 1997, where he proposed to solve the territorial problem with a peace treaty by 2000. Yeltsin also asked Hashimoto to consider financial assistance to Russia to the measure of $3 or $4 billion. Hashimoto also promoted the idea of increasing economic cooperation, which was called the Hashimoto–Yeltsin plan. In mid-April 1998, the Kanawa summit between the two leaders included Hashimoto making a proposal of having the four disputed Kuril islands coming under Japanese sovereignty. Yeltsin made a public statement about it and that he was considering accepting it, which prompted the Russian government and media to unite against this. By the autumn of 1998, the proposal had died after so much opposition in Russia, and Hashimoto was out of office after the July 1998 parliamentary election. Nonetheless, about $1.5 billion of the World Bank/IMF loan to Russia came from Japan. A meeting in November 1998 between Foreign Minister Keizo Obuchi and Yeltsin in Moscow took place, where Russia proposed to give Japan special status over the islands jointly with Russia as transitory legal regime. The Japanese side was cautious to the proposal and by 1999 there was a stalemate on the territorial question, while the economic initiatives stalled in their implementation.

On July 30, 1998, the newly elected Japanese prime minister Keizō Obuchi had focused on major issues: signing a peace treaty with Russia, and renewing the Japanese economy. However, he died soon afterwards.

=== Current relations (1999–present) ===
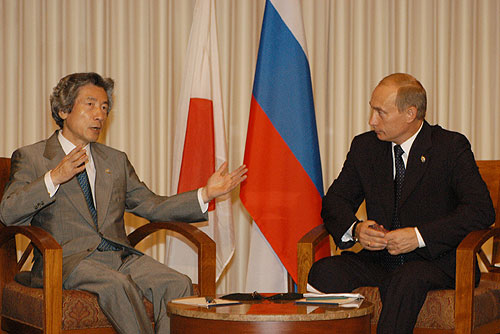
Vladimir Putin and Junichiro Koizumi in 2003 at the APEC Summit

In March 2014, following Russia's annexation of Crimea, Japan imposed several sanctions against Russia, which included halting consultations on easing the visa regulations between the two countries and suspension of talks on investment cooperation, joint space exploration and prevention of dangerous military activity.

On 27 April 2018, in Moscow was held the fourth Russia-Japan forum dubbed The Points of Convergence, where the sides discussed pressing issues concerning the two countries’ trade and economic relations. Toshihiro Nikai, the secretary general of Japan's ruling Liberal Democratic Party, was the forum's special guest, read out Japanese Prime Minister Shinzo Abe's address at the event's opening ceremony. Participants discussed the two countries’ tourism cooperation, investment projects for the Far East and other Russian regions, as well as interaction in the areas of infrastructure, technology and energy industry.

On June 23, 2018, Russia and Japan inked a memorandum of understanding (MOU) in Russia's Far Eastern Republic of Sakha (Yakutia) to expand cooperation between the two countries.

In June 2018, Japan's Princess Hisako Takamado travelled to Russia to cheer on her national team at the FIFA World Cup. She is the first member of the Imperial family to come to Russia since 1916.

Japan is on Russia's "Unfriendly Countries List" (red). Countries and territories on the list have imposed or joined sanctions against Russia.

In November 2019, Japan's foreign minister stated he would visit Russia in December for talks about a formal World War Two peace treaty, in an effort to improve relations.

On March 7, 2022, in a House of Councillors Budget Committee session Japan's Prime Minister Fumio Kishida described a chain of islets off the northernmost prefecture of Hokkaido that have been long-disputed with Russia as Japan's "inherent territory". Also in solidarity with Ukraine over Russia's invasion of Ukraine, Japan joined in the implementation of the Western-led sanctions against Russia and Belarus, by sanctioning a number of people linked to the Government of Russia and revoking Russia's "most favored nation" status.

Despite suggestions from LDP lawmakers, prime minister Kishida did not abolish the post of Minister for Economic Cooperation with Russia in the August 2022 reshuffle. The newly appointed minister Yasutoshi Nishimura stated there is no policy change in keeping interests in the Sakhalin-II oil and gas project in Russia, one of the world's largest integrated oil and gas projects owned by Gazprom, Shell, Mitsui and Mitsubishi. In 2023, Russia renamed the commemoration of Victory over Japan Day on September 3 from "Day of the End of World War II (1945)" to "Day of Victory over Militaristic Japan and the End of World War II (1945)", a move Japan called "extremely regrettable".

During the 2025 China–Japan diplomatic crisis, Russia supported China and condemned remarks made by Japanese Prime Minister Sanae Takaichi that a Chinese attack on Taiwan could potentially constitute an "existential crisis". On 18 November 2025, Foreign Ministry spokeswoman Maria Zakharova said in an interview with Xinhua News Agency in Moscow that Takaichi's remarks were "extremely dangerous and that Japan should deeply reflect on its history and learn from the lessons of World War II to avoid serious consequences caused by wrong words and deeds". On 20 November, Zakharova said that "Not only does Japan fail to reflect on the mistakes of its recent remarks, but it also refuses to acknowledge the results of World War II even 80 years later". After a meeting between Chinese Foreign Minister Wang Yi and Russian Security Council Secretary Sergei Shoigu on 3 December, China and Russia released a joint statement saying that they had "conducted strategic alignment on issues related to Japan, reaching a high degree of consensus" and "agreed to resolutely uphold the outcomes of World War II victory, firmly oppose any attempts to whitewash colonial aggression and resolutely counter any attempts to revive fascism or Japanese militarism". Shoigu added that "the hydra of militarism is once again raising its head" but that China and Russia "will not allow the revival of criminal regimes in Europe and Tokyo".

In September 2026, Putin said "everything that is happening now, the deterioration in our relationship, is entirely down to the Japanese government". In October 2026, the Federal Security Service (FSB) arrested a The Hokkaido Shimbun journalist for allegations of spying in Russia. The journalist was identified as Yuki Imai, assigned to the paper's Yuzhno-Sakhalinsk bureau, who was arrested by the FSB before he was due to fly back to Japan. Imai is being held for pre-trial detention to December 12, 2026. In response, Japanese foreign ministry summoned Russian ambassador Nikolay Nozdrev and said "The Japanese embassy … in Moscow and the consulate general in Yuzhno-Sakhalinsk lodged a request with the Russian authorities for the prompt provision of information, as well as for humanitarian consideration and fair and impartial treatment". In November 2026, Takaichi and Putin held a 30-minute meeting on the sidelines of APEC China 2026, the first meeting between Japanese and Russian leaders since the 2022 Russian invasion of Ukraine.

== Kuril Islands dispute ==
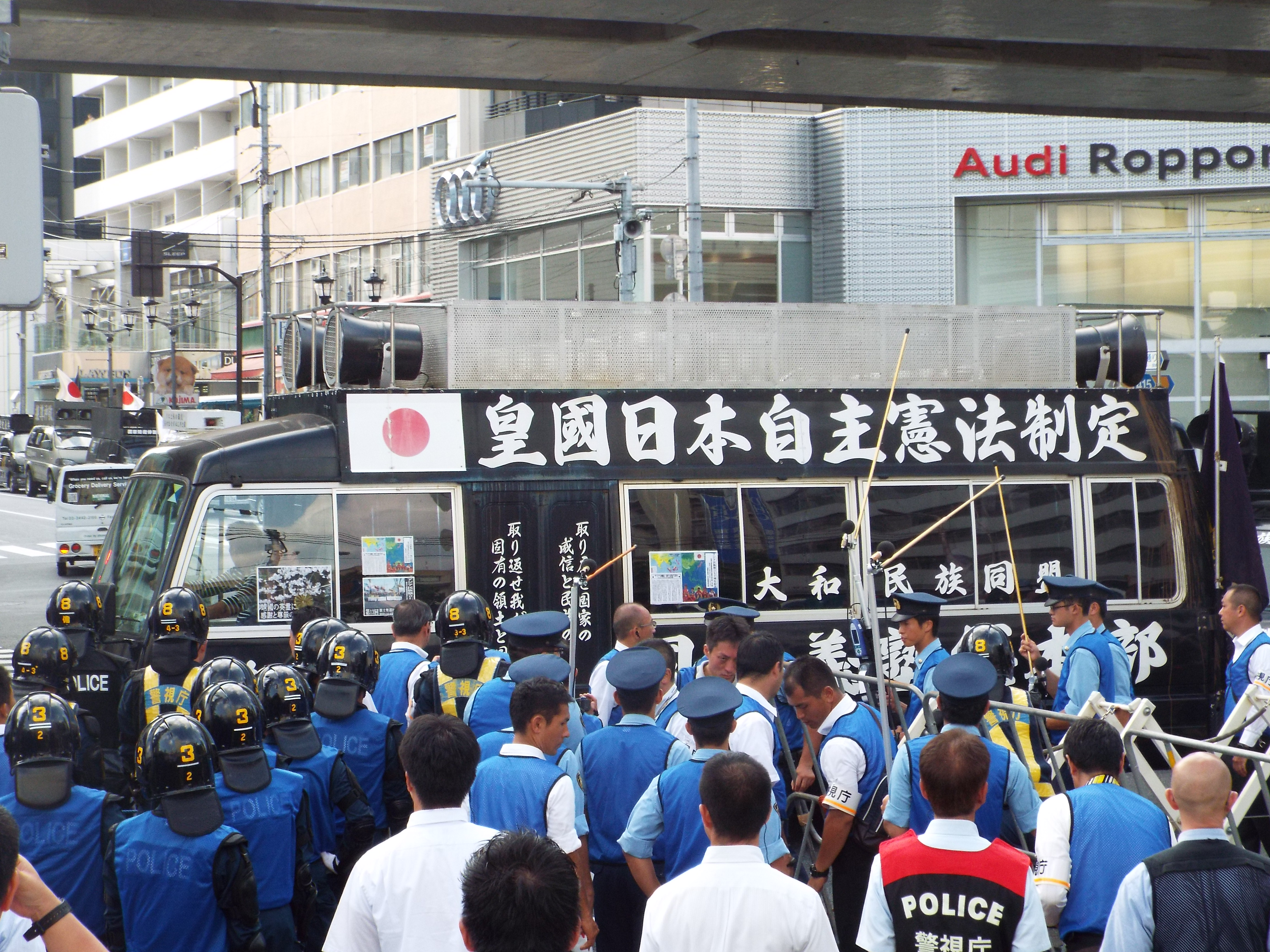
Right Wing truck confronting the Japanese police near the Russian Embassy on August 9, 2015

Relations between Russia and Japan since the end of World War II have been defined by the dispute over sovereignty of the Kuril Islands and concluding a peace treaty. In the spring of 1992 the Russian General Staff received reports that the Japanese began discussing the possible return of the northern territories. President Boris Yeltsin was considering giving up the Southern Kurils in 1992. Throughout the 1990s, efforts were made to come to some agreement by President Yeltsin and Prime Minister Keizō Obuchi. One of the goals of the Obuchi was to sign a peace treaty with Russia by 2000, which he did not achieve. He visited Russia in November 1998.

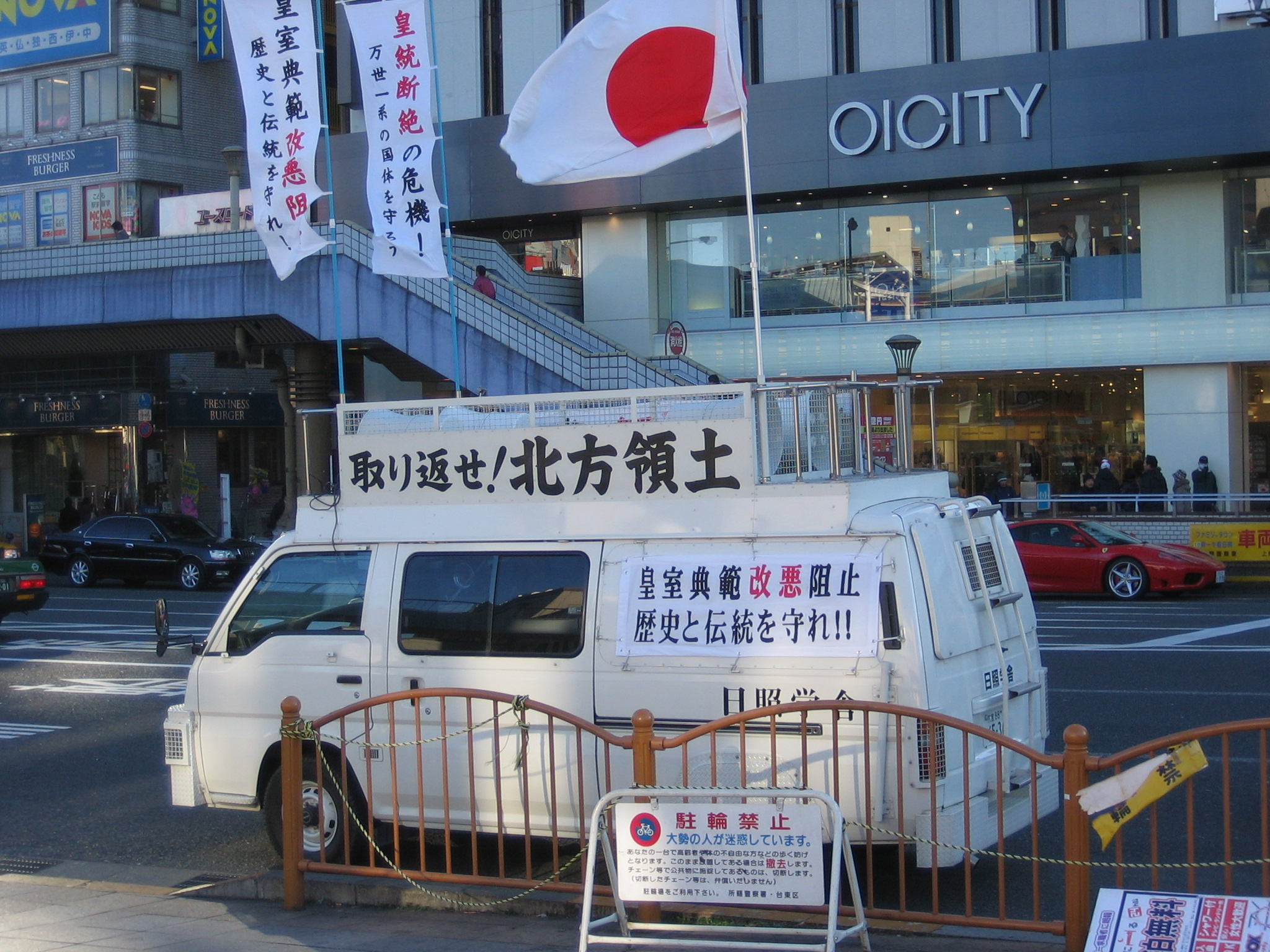
Right Wing van blasting propaganda about the Kuril Islands (北方領土) in front of a shopping mall

On August 16, 2006, Russian maritime authorities killed a Japanese fisherman and captured a crab fishing boat in the waters around the disputed Kuril Islands. The Russian foreign ministry has claimed that the death was caused by a "stray bullet".

On September 28, 2006, Russian Foreign Minister Sergei Lavrov said Russia would "continue the dialogue with the new Japanese government. We will build our relations, how the people of the two countries want them to be. Then-Foreign Minister Taro Aso remained on his post in the government. We have good, long-standing relations, we will act under the elaborated program."

The dispute over the Southern Kuril Islands deteriorated Russo-Japan relations when the Japanese government published a new guideline for school textbooks on July 16, 2008, to teach Japanese children that their country has sovereignty over the Kuril Islands. The Russian public was generally outraged by the action and demanded the government to counteract. The Foreign Ministry of Russia announced on July 18, 2008 "[these actions] contribute neither to the development of positive cooperation between the two countries, nor to the settlement of the dispute," and reaffirmed its sovereignty over the islands.

In 2010, President of Russia Dmitry Medvedev became the first Russian president to take a state trip to the Kuril Islands. Medvedev shortly after ordered significant reinforcements to the Russian defences on the Kuril Islands. Medvedev was replaced by Vladimir Putin in 2012.

In November 2013, Japan held its first ever diplomatic talks with the Russian Federation, and the first with Moscow since the year 1973.

In September 2017, Prime Minister Shinzo Abe and Russian President Vladimir Putin met at Eastern Economic Forum, which held at Far Eastern Federal University in Vladivostok. The main reason of meeting was approving joint economic activities on disputed islands off Hokkaido. In their talks the two leaders decided to sign off on joint projects in five areas — aquaculture, greenhouse farming, tourism, wind power and waste reduction.

At the 2018 Thirteenth East Asia Summit in Singapore, Shinzo Abe followed up on a proposal from Vladimir Putin to sign a peace treaty without preconditions by the end of the year. The Soviet–Japanese Joint Declaration of 1956 promised that the USSR would give Japan the Habomai islet group and Shikotan and keep the remaining islands, in return for negotiation of a formal peace treaty. At the time, the United States threatened to keep Okinawa if Japan gave away the other islands, preventing the negotiation of the promised treaty. Putin and Abe agreed that the terms of the 1956 deal would be part of a bilateral peace treaty.

The outbreak of the 2022 Russian invasion of Ukraine prompted Japan's hardline stance on the disputed islands. On March 7, 2022, Prime Minister Fumio Kishida declared the southern Kurils as "a territory peculiar to Japan, a territory in which Japan has sovereignty." Foreign Minister Yoshimasa Hayashi added that they are an "integral part" of Japan.

On 13 August 2026, Russian President Vladimir Putin toured a school, hospital, and fish-processing plant on Iturup, marking his first trip to the Kuril Islands. Japan's foreign ministry summoned the Russian ambassador and strongly protested the visit, while Japanese Prime Minister Sanae Takaichi stated the visit was "absolutely unacceptable" and had "worsened Japanese sentiment towards Russia". Putin and later the Russian foreign ministry rejected their Japanese counterparts' statements and Japan's claims to the southern Kurils, asserting that Russian sovereignty had already been settled by post-WWII agreements.

== Military relations ==
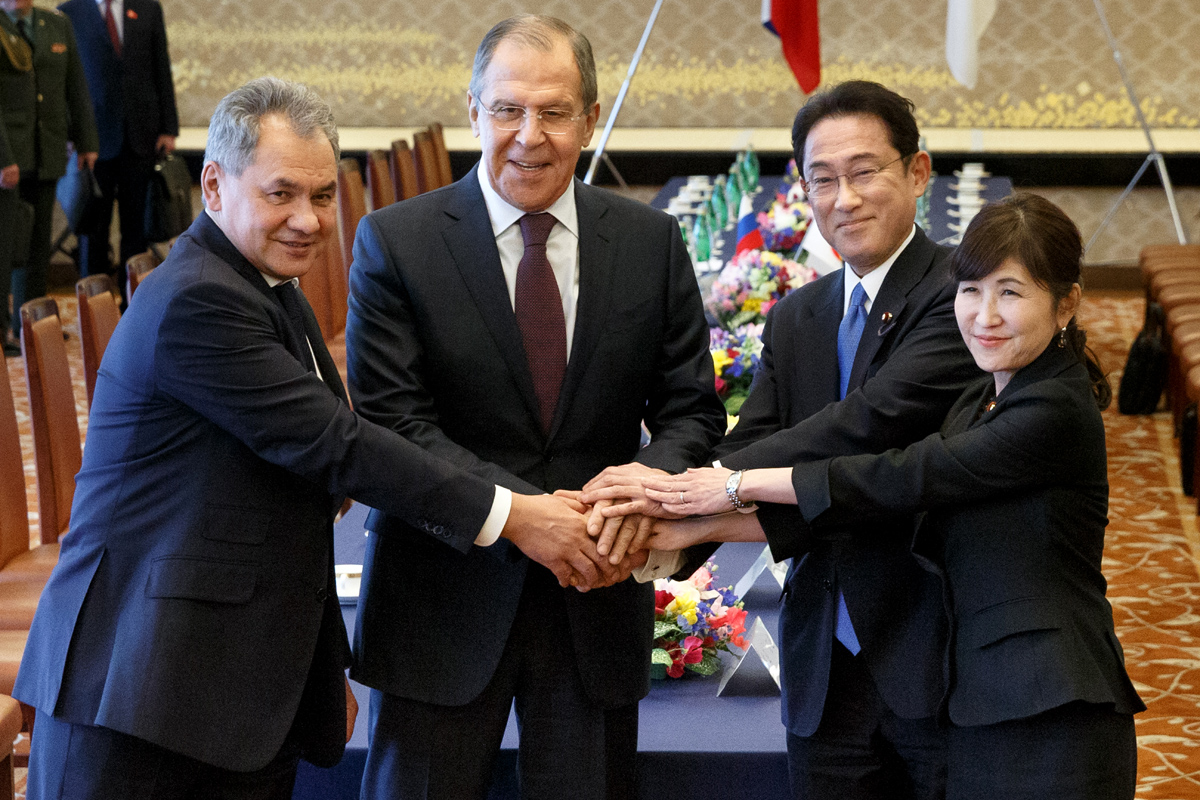
Japanese Foreign Minister Fumio Kishida with Russian Defense Minister Sergei Shoigu and Russian Foreign Minister Sergey Lavrov in March 2017

The Russian Chief of General Staff, General Valery Gerasimov, visited Tokyo in mid-December 2017 to meet with his Japanese counterpart, Admiral Katsutoshi Kawano. He stated that there would be more than thirty joint military drills held by Russia and Japan in 2018. Russia's military chief, Gen. Valery Gerasimov, warned Defense Minister Itsunori Onodera in Tokyo that military exercises conducted by the United States around the Korean Peninsula will destabilize the region. Apparently with such exercises in mind, Gerasimov told Onodera at the outset of their talks, “Exercises in surrounding areas would increase tension and bring instability.” Onodera sought Russia's cooperation in dealing with North Korea's nuclear and missile provocations, saying Moscow has “big clout” with North Korea. In December 2024, the Financial Times reported that leaked Russian documents originally created in 2013 and 2014 outlined Russian military plans for attacks on Japan and South Korea in the event of a wider conflict.

== Public opinion ==
=== Japanese public opinion of Russia ===
According to February 2023 poll commissioned by the Cabinet Office, 94.7% of Japanese respondents "do not feel friendly" towards Russia, while only 5% do. According to a March 2026 poll by The Yomiuri Shimbun and the Japan Institute of International Affairs, 87% of Japanese think Russia poses a threat to Japan’s national security.

=== Russian public opinion of Japan ===
According to a May 2025 poll by the Levada Center, 41% of Russians have a favorable opinion of Japan, while 41% have an unfavorable opinion. This was down from 2009, when 78% had favorable opinions of Japan.

== See also ==
- Russians in Japan
- Japanese people in Russia
- Empire of Japan–Russian Empire relations
- Japan–Soviet Union relations
- International relations of the Great Powers (1814–1919)
- Diplomatic history of World War I
- International relations (1919–1939)
- Diplomatic history of World War II
- Cold War
- International relations since 1989
- Monument to the Victory over Japan
