= Liberation Monument (Pyongyang) =

Monument in Pyongyang, North Korea

Coordinates: 39°2′6.40″N 125°45′30.56″E

The Liberation Monument

The Liberation Monument is a monument in Pyongyang, North Korea. It was built in 1947 to honour Red Army soldiers who took part in capturing Korea from Imperial Japan during the final stage of the Second World War. Soviet paratroopers took control of Pyongyang on August 24, 1945. The monument is composed of a stele surmounted by a five-pointed red star, with the entire structure attaining a height of 30 meters. The square base of the monument bears an inscription on each of its sides. The text, in Russian and Korean, describes the purpose of the monument. The monument is often visited by official delegations as well as by tourists and city residents. It has become traditional for newlywed couples to visit the monument as well.

== History ==
The monument was built in 1947. The original monument featured the Taegukgi, including a Korean woman waving the flag over the Heavenly Lake at the Paektu mountain. It survived the Korean War, and was not demolished when United Nations Forces controlled Pyongyang. The monument was redesigned in 1959 before an anticipated visit by Soviet leader Nikita Khrushchev, which was ultimately canceled. The redesigns included the removal of the image of Joseph Stalin and the removal of the Taegukgi. When informed of the redesign, Soviet ambassador Alexander Puzanov expressed his reservations, writing in his journal that "For my part, I expressed doubts about the expediency of replacing some of the inscriptions, although it really should be done on the eve of the arrival of our delegation".

== Inscriptions ==
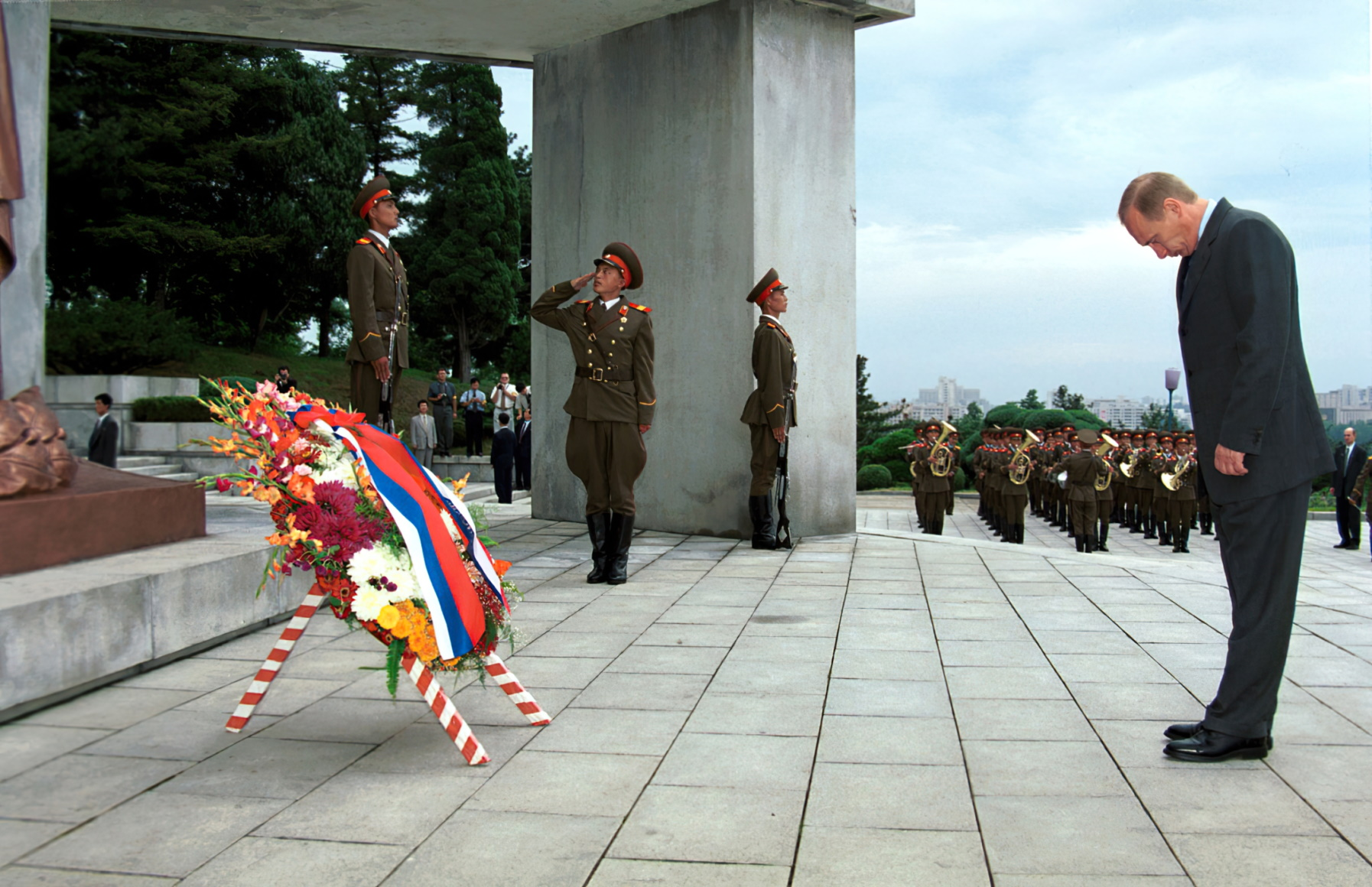
Russian president Vladimir Putin visiting the monument in 2000

Primary Russian text (Front side):

Великий советский народ разгромил японских империалистов и освободил корейский народ. Кровью, пролитой советскими воинами при освобождении Кореи, еще больше укрепились узы дружбы между корейским и советским народами. В знак всенародной благодарности воздвигнут этот памятник. 15 августа 1945 года.

English translation:

The great Soviet people defeated the Japanese imperialists and liberated the Korean people. The blood shed by Soviet soldiers during the liberation of Korea has served to strengthen the bonds of friendship binding the Korean and the Soviet peoples. This monument was erected to signify the gratitude of the Korean people. August 15, 1945.

Secondary Russian inscription (Back side)

Вечная слава великой Советской Армии, освободившей корейский народ от ига японских империалистов и открывшей ему путь к свободе и независимости! 15 августа 1945 г.

English translation:

Eternal glory to the great Soviet Army that liberated Korean people from Japanese imperialists and showed them the way to freedom and independence! August 15, 1945.

Originally, the inscriptions wrote:

The heroic exploit of the great Soviet Union which liberated the Korean people from Japan’s oppression will forever shine to the endless generations. August 15, 1945.

Secondary inscription:

Under the leadership of the Great Generalissimo Stalin, victory over Japanese imperialism has been achieved. With this victory and the blood spilled by the friendship of the Korean and Soviet people became even stronger. This monument is erected to show the gratitude of the entire nation. August 15, 1945

== See also ==
- Monument to the Victory over Japan, Russia
