= Dolinsk, Sakhalin Oblast =

Town in Sakhalin Oblast, Russia

Dolinsk Долинск
- Town
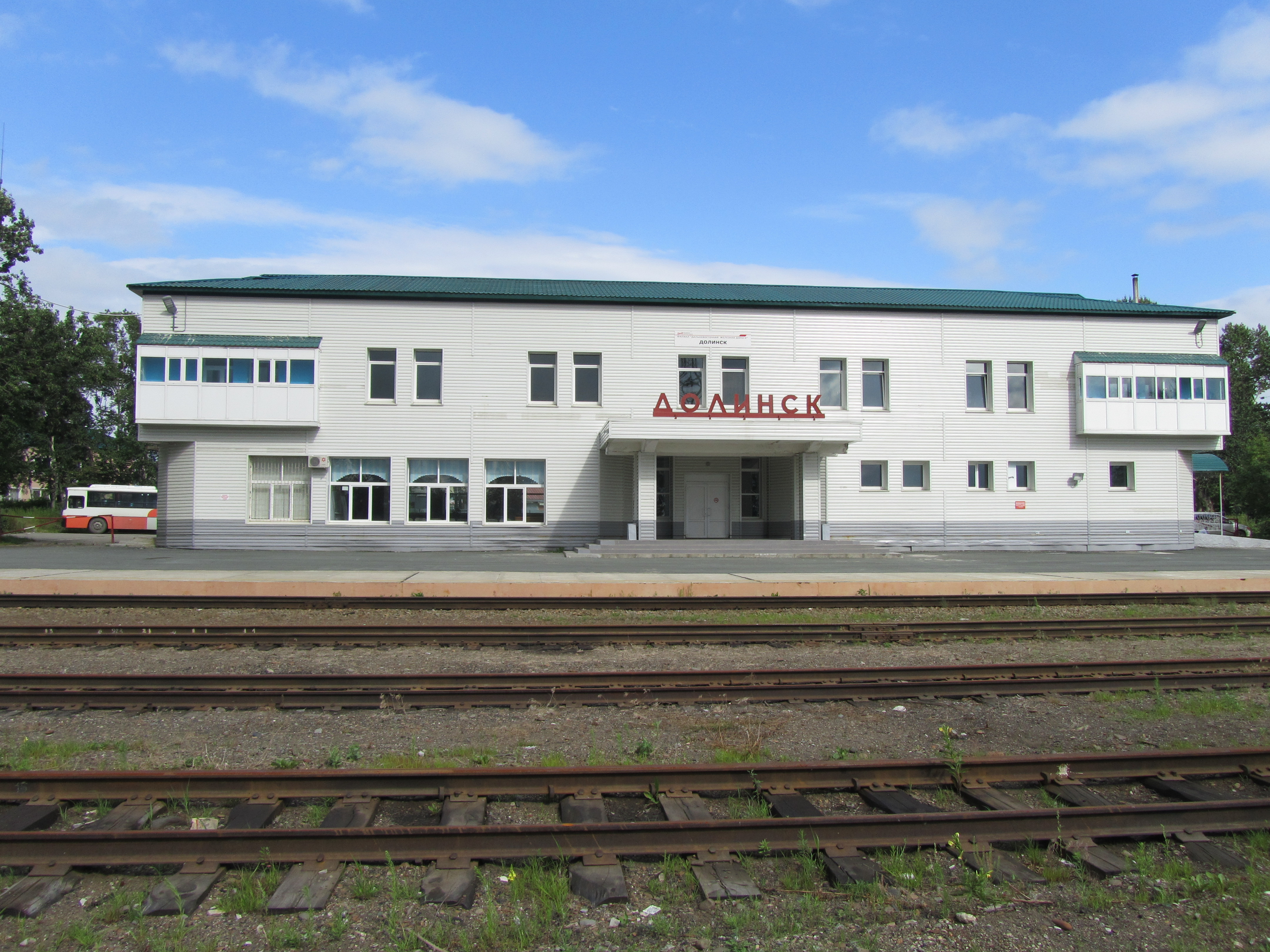
- Sakhalin Railway in Dolinsk

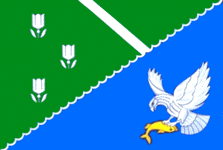
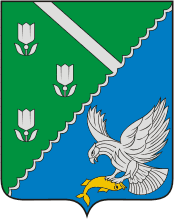
- Flag Coat of arms
- Interactive map of Dolinsk
- Location of Dolinsk Dolinsk (Sakhalin Oblast)
- Coordinates: 47°19′N 142°48′E
- Country: Russia
- Federal subject: Sakhalin Oblast
- Administrative district: Dolinsky District
- Founded: 1884

Government
  - Head: Alexander Tugarev
- Elevation: 20 m (66 ft)

Population (2010 Census)
  - Total: 12,200
  - Estimate (1 January 2024): 11,840 (−3%)

Administrative status
  - Capital of: Dolinsky District

Municipal status
  - Urban okrug: Dolinsky Urban Okrug
  - Capital of: Dolinsky Urban Okrug
- Time zone: UTC+11 (MSK+8)
- Postal code: 694051–694052
- Dialing code: +7 42442
- OKTMO ID: 64712000001

Dolinsk (Russian: Долинск; Japanese: 落合, Hepburn: Ochiai-chō) is a town and the administrative center of Dolinsky District of Sakhalin Oblast, Russia, located in the southeast of the Sakhalin Island in the valley of the Naiba River and its tributaries, about 45 kilometers (28 mi) north of Yuzhno-Sakhalinsk and 10 kilometers (6.2 mi) from the coast of the Terpeniye Bay of the Sea of Okhotsk.

== Demographics ==
Population: 12,200 (2010 census); 12,555 (2002 census); 15,653 (1989 Soviet census).

== History ==
The present site of the town was the location of the Ainu settlement Ziancha until 1884, when the Russian village of Galkino-Vraskoye (named after Mikhail Galkin-Vraskoy) was founded. The Treaty of Portsmouth saw it transferred to Japanese control in 1905, along with the rest of southern Sakhalin. It was given machi (town) status by the Japanese, under the name Ochiai (Japanese: 落合町, Hepburn: Ochiai-chō).

The Red Army retook control of the whole of Sakhalin in 1945, during the closing stages of World War II. In 1946, the town received its present name, roughly translating as town in the valley.

Since the 1940s, the town's population has decreased by more than half, from a high of 25,135 in 1941 down to 12,200 inhabitants recorded in the 2010 Census.

== Administrative and municipal status ==
Within the framework of administrative divisions, Dolinsk serves as the administrative center of Dolinsky District and is subordinated to it. As a municipal division, the town of Dolinsk and twelve rural localities of Dolinsky District are incorporated as Dolinsky Urban Okrug.

== Economy ==
Paper and machinery are produced in the town, with fishing and coal mining conducted in the surrounding area.

=== Transportation ===
The main north-south Sakhalin railway connecting Yuzhno-Sakhalinsk with Nogliki passes through the town.

== Military ==
The Dolinsk-Sokol air force base is located to the south of the town.

== Climate ==
Like the rest of southern Sakhalin, Dolinsk has a cold humid continental climate (Köppen Dfb) with cold and snowy winters and mild, rainy summers. Lying exposed to moist southeasterly flows from the Pacific Ocean, it is substantially wetter than either Yuzhno-Sakhalinsk or Alexandrovsk-Sakhalinsky, and receives very heavy snow in winter.

Climate data for Dolinsk
Month	Jan	Feb	Mar	Apr	May	Jun	Jul	Aug	Sep	Oct	Nov	Dec	Year
Record high °C (°F)	8.9 (48.0)	7.2 (45.0)	13.9 (57.0)	21.1 (70.0)	30.0 (86.0)	31.1 (88.0)	35.0 (95.0)	33.9 (93.0)	31.1 (88.0)	26.1 (79.0)	17.8 (64.0)	7.2 (45.0)	35.0 (95.0)
Mean daily maximum °C (°F)	−8.5 (16.7)	−7.2 (19.0)	−2.0 (28.4)	5.7 (42.3)	12.7 (54.9)	16.8 (62.2)	20.4 (68.7)	21.6 (70.9)	18.3 (64.9)	11.5 (52.7)	2.1 (35.8)	−4.9 (23.2)	7.2 (45.0)
Daily mean °C (°F)	−13.2 (8.2)	−12.3 (9.9)	−6.5 (20.3)	1.4 (34.5)	7.1 (44.8)	11.2 (52.2)	15.3 (59.5)	16.8 (62.2)	12.9 (55.2)	6.3 (43.3)	−2.2 (28.0)	−9.3 (15.3)	2.2 (36.0)
Mean daily minimum °C (°F)	−17.7 (0.1)	−17.4 (0.7)	−11.3 (11.7)	−2.5 (27.5)	2.7 (36.9)	7.0 (44.6)	11.5 (52.7)	13.0 (55.4)	8.4 (47.1)	1.9 (35.4)	−6.2 (20.8)	−13.7 (7.3)	−2.1 (28.2)
Record low °C (°F)	−38.9 (−38.0)	−32.8 (−27.0)	−32.2 (−26.0)	−22.2 (−8.0)	−7.2 (19.0)	−2.2 (28.0)	1.1 (34.0)	2.0 (35.6)	−5.0 (23.0)	−11.1 (12.0)	−24.6 (−12.3)	−31.1 (−24.0)	−38.9 (−38.0)
Average precipitation mm (inches)	72.5 (2.85)	76.6 (3.02)	77.4 (3.05)	59.5 (2.34)	82.4 (3.24)	88.7 (3.49)	105.7 (4.16)	113.6 (4.47)	135.0 (5.31)	107.0 (4.21)	86.0 (3.39)	102.0 (4.02)	1,106.4 (43.55)
Average precipitation days	13	10	12	9	9	9	11	11	11	11	11	15	132
Average relative humidity (%)	77	76	78	72	75	82	86	87	82	78	75	78	79
Source: Weatherbase

== Sister city ==
- Nayoro, Japan

== Notable people ==
- Larisa Leonidovna Petrik (Russian: Лариса Леонидовна Петрик; born 28 August 1949, Dolinsk, Sakhalin) is a former Russian gymnast and Olympic champion.
