= Relations between Japanese revolutionaries, the Comintern and the Soviet Union =

Relations between Japanese revolutionaries, the Comintern and the Soviet Union existed from the 1920s until the collapse of the Soviet Union in 1991.

== History ==
The Comintern made first contact with Japanese revolutionaries in 1920. It helped establish the Japanese Communist Party. Both the Comintern and the JCP had close relations. The JCP had financial ties with both the Comintern, and the Soviet government.

The Soviet Union solicited working-class Japanese to study at the Communist University of the Toilers of the East (KUTV), known as "Kutobe" by the Japanese.

Many Japanese activists who resided in the Soviet Union became victims of Stalin's Great Purge.

The relationship between the JCP and the Soviet Union deteriorated by the 1960s, when Pro‐Chinese members became the majority of the party.

== See also ==
- Japan–Soviet Union relations
- Japanese dissidence during the Shōwa period
- Japanese people in Russia
