= Cape Velikan =

National park in Kansai, Japan

- Мыс Великан
- IUCN category III (natural monument or feature)
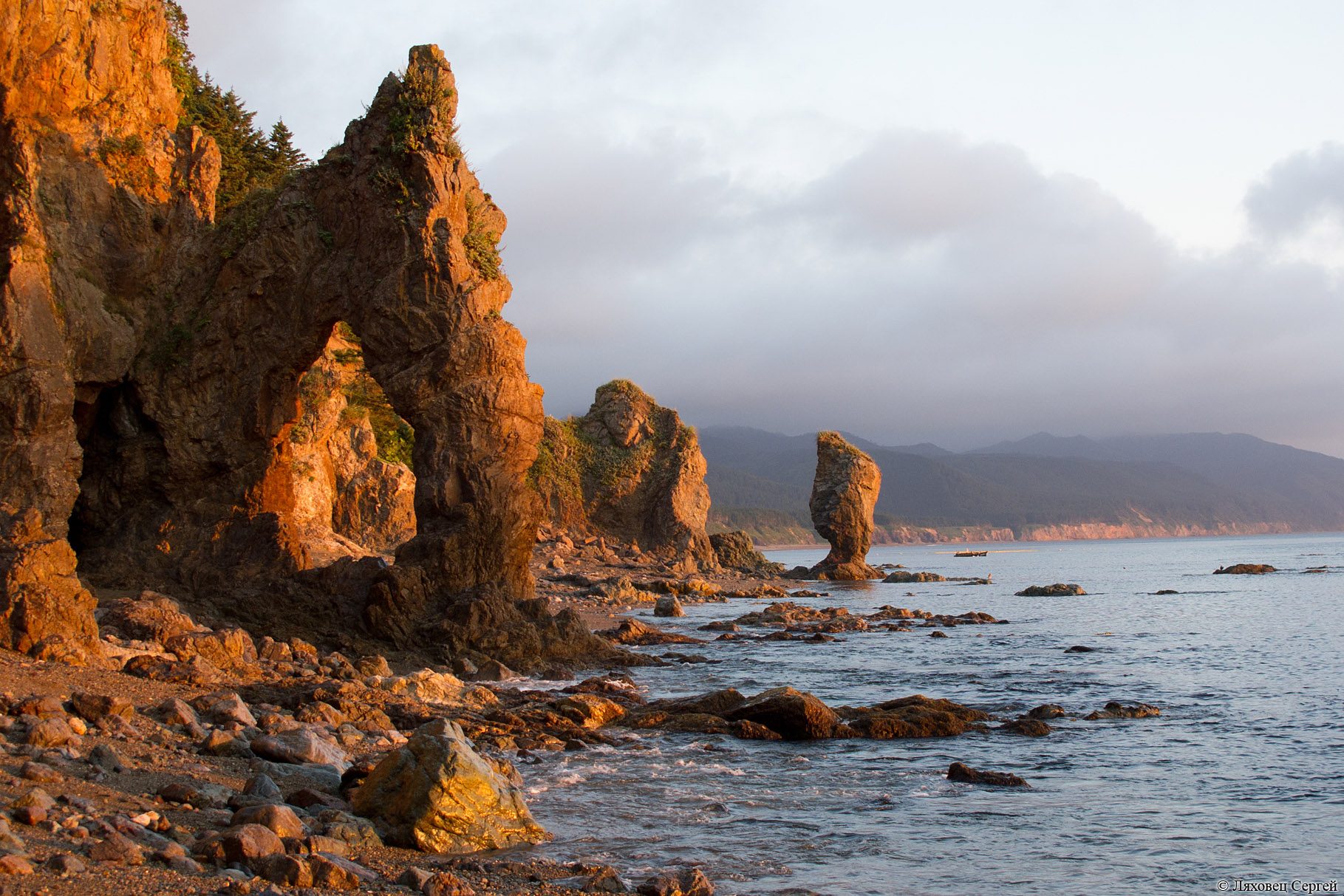
- Interactive map of Cape Velikan
- Location: Korsakovsky District, Sakhalin Oblast, Russia
- Nearest town: Korsakov
- Coordinates: 46°37′49″N 143°30′57″E
- Area: 39.4 ha (97 acres)
- Established: 28 March 1990

Cape Velikan (Russian: Мыс Великан) is a cape on the Sea of Okhotsk coast of the Tonino-Aniva Peninsula in southeast Sakhalin, Korsakovsky District, Sakhalin Oblast, Russia. The cape is a Natural Monument of regional importance; established in 1990, the protected area covers 39.4 ha (97 acres).

The protected area runs from the mouth of the Kedrovka River, to the north, to the pebble beach 120 metres (390 ft) south of the cape. The west border is formed by the logging road, the east by the offshore rocks that are exposed at low tide. The area includes a complex of coastal ecosystems, comprising the flora of the rocks and supralittoral zone — Sargent's juniper (Juniperus chinensis subsp. sargentii), Japanese spikenard (Aralia cordata), and the local spruce-fir forest — a seal rookery, and a bird colony and nesting site.

Within the area, hunting, fishing, specimen collection, and tree felling (other than thinning for maintenance purposes in areas of forest plantation) are prohibited, as is visiting the bird colony between 1 May and 1 August.

== See also ==
- Protected areas of Russia
- La Pérouse Strait
