= Ushishir =

Uninhabited island in the Kuril Island chain

Native name: Ушишир (Russian); 宇志知島 (Japanese)
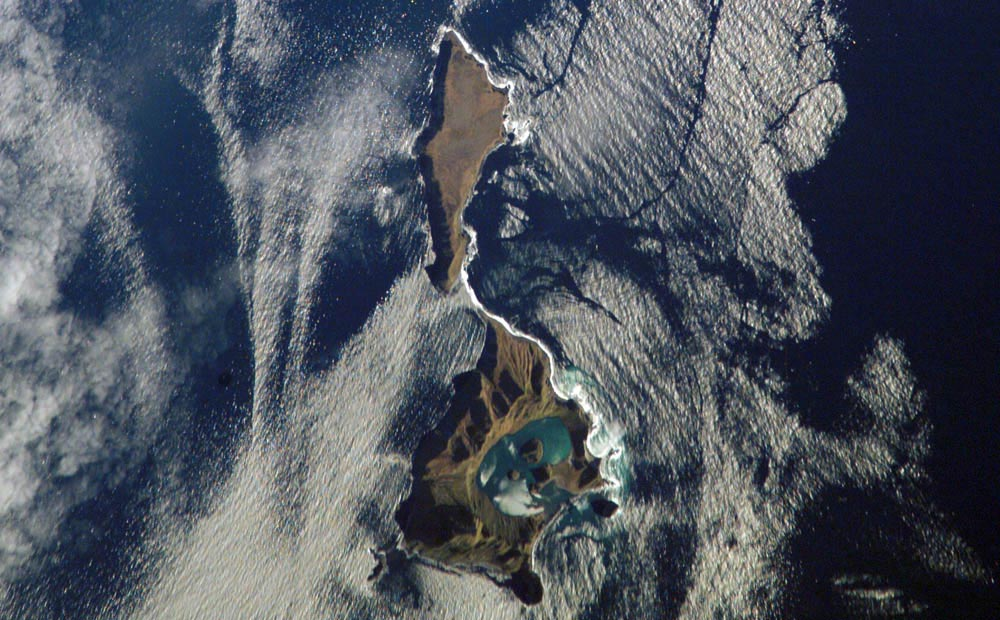
- NASA picture of Ushishir Island

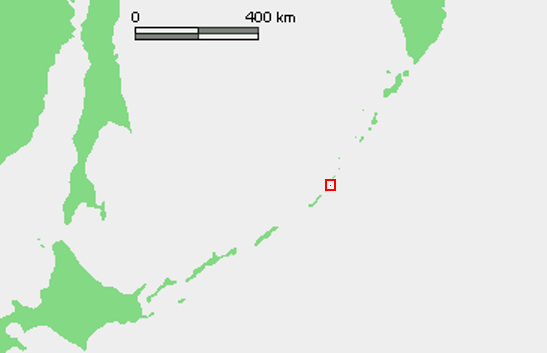

Geography
- Location: Sea of Okhotsk
- Coordinates: 47.52°N 152.80°E
- Archipelago: Kuril Islands
- Area: 5 km^{2} (1.9 sq mi)
- Highest elevation: 401 m (1316 ft)
- Highest point: Mikasayama

Administration
- Russia

Demographics
- Population: 0
- Ethnic groups: Ainu (formerly)

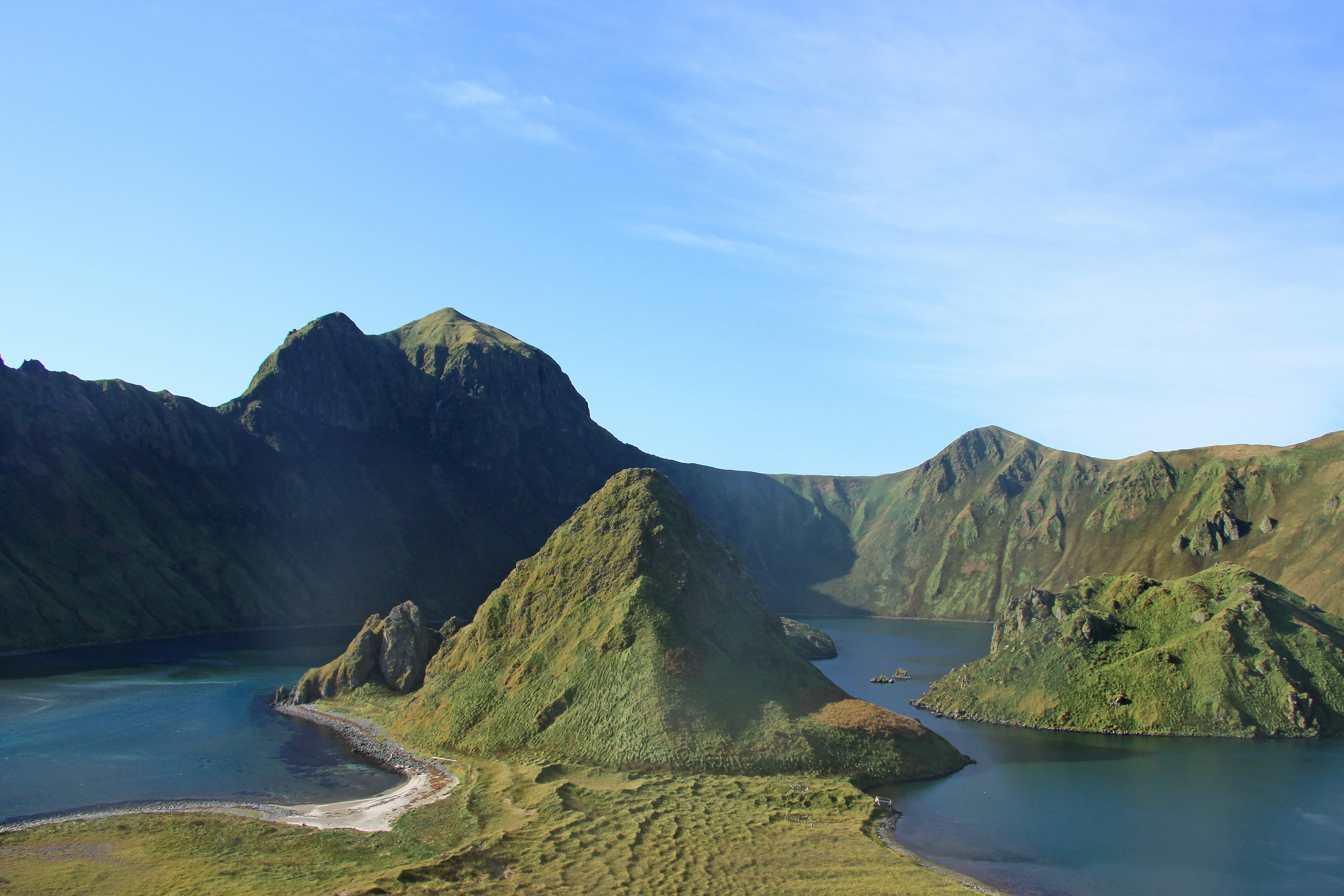
Caldera and bay of Yankicha

Ushishir (Russian: Ушишир; Japanese: 宇志知島, romanized: Ushishiru-tō; Ainu: ウシシㇼ, lit. 'land of the bay') is a collective name for two uninhabited volcanic islands and several reefs, all being parts of an eponymous partially submerged volcano, located in the centre of the Kuril Islands chain in the Sea of Okhotsk in the northwest Pacific Ocean. Its name is derived from the Ainu language for "hot spring".

== Geology ==
Ushishir consists of two islets almost connected by a narrow spit of land with an area of 5 km^{2} (1.9 sq mi).

These islets are the tops of a partially submerged volcano. The southern island, Yankicha (Russian: Янкича), consists of the summit caldera and has a maximum width of 2.5 kilometres (1.6 miles). The caldera has a diameter of 1.6 kilometres (1.0 mile), and is breached on the south, forming a sea-water Crater Bay. The bay has an estimated depth of 30 metres (98 feet), and there is strong evidence of ongoing underwater volcanic activity, as evidenced by frequent bubbles, altered water chemistry and the presence of bacteria mats. Two small lava domes form small islands in the central lagoon, and numerous fumaroles and hot springs are along the southeast caldera shoreline. The island's highest point Mikasayama (御笠山) is 401 metres (1,316 feet) high, and is on the eastern shore. The northern islet (Ryponkicha Russian: o. Рыпонкича) is the smaller of the two, and consists of a portion of the volcano's flank, with sheer cliffs rising up 131 metres (430 feet) from the sea. Ushishir is an active volcano with the last known eruption in 1884.

== Fauna ==
In the spring and summer some of the largest colonies of crested and whiskered auklet in the Kuril Islands are found on the island; least auklet also nest here.

== History ==
Ushishir had no permanent habitation prior to European contact, but was visited in summer by the Ainu tribes from Rasshua, who regarded the island as a sacred land, which they identified as the home of the thunder god. Remains of Ainu huts have been found on the northern slopes of Yankicha's Crater Bay. Claimed by the Empire of Russia, sovereignty over Ushishir was passed to the Empire of Japan per the Treaty of Saint Petersburg along with the rest of the Kuril Islands. Approaches to the island are difficult due to frequent fogs, rapid ocean currents and the presence of numerous small offshore rocks. The island was formerly administered as part of Shimushiro District of Nemuro Subprefecture of Hokkaidō. After World War II, the island came under the control of the Soviet Union, and is now administered as part of the Sakhalin Oblast of the Russian Federation.

== See also ==
- List of volcanoes in Russia
