= Crater Bay =

Bay in Yankicha island, Russia

Coordinates: 47.515°N 152.815°E

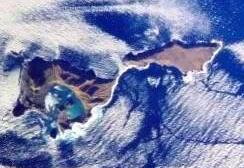
NASA picture of the Ushishir Islands: Yankicha and Riponkicha.

Crater Bay (Russian: бухта Кратерная, romanized: bukhta Kraternaya) is a bay located in Yankicha island of the Ushishir Islands, which are part of the Greater Kuril Chain, in the Russian Far East. This bay was formed by an active volcano (also named Ushishir).

The Russian Far East generates much revenue from tourism at Crater Bay. The Kuril Islands, being a part of the Pacific Ring of Fire, have several volcanoes.
