= Japan–Soviet Union relations =

- Japan: Soviet Union

Imperial Japan–Soviet Union relations
- Japan: Soviet Union

Japan–Russian SFSR relations
- Japan: Russian SFSR

Relations between the Soviet Union and Japan between the Communist takeover in 1917 and the collapse of Communism in 1991 tended to be hostile. Japan had sent troops to counter the Bolshevik presence in Russia's Far East during the Russian Civil War, and both countries had been in opposite camps during World War II and the Cold War. In addition, territorial conflicts over the Kuril Islands and South Sakhalin were a constant source of tension. These, with a number of smaller conflicts, prevented both countries from signing a peace treaty after World War II, and even today matters remain unresolved.

Strains in Japan–Soviet Union relations have deep historical roots, going back to the competition of the Japanese and Russian empires for dominance in Northeast Asia. The Soviet government refused to sign the 1951 peace treaty and the state of war between the Soviet Union and Japan technically existed until 1956, when it was ended by the Soviet–Japanese Joint Declaration of 1956. A formal peace treaty between the Soviet Union (subsequently Russia) and Japan still has not been signed.

The main stumbling block to improving relations between the Soviet Union and Japan in the post-war period has been the territorial dispute over the Kurils, which are known as the Northern Territories in Japan.

== Russian Civil War and recognition (1917–1925) ==
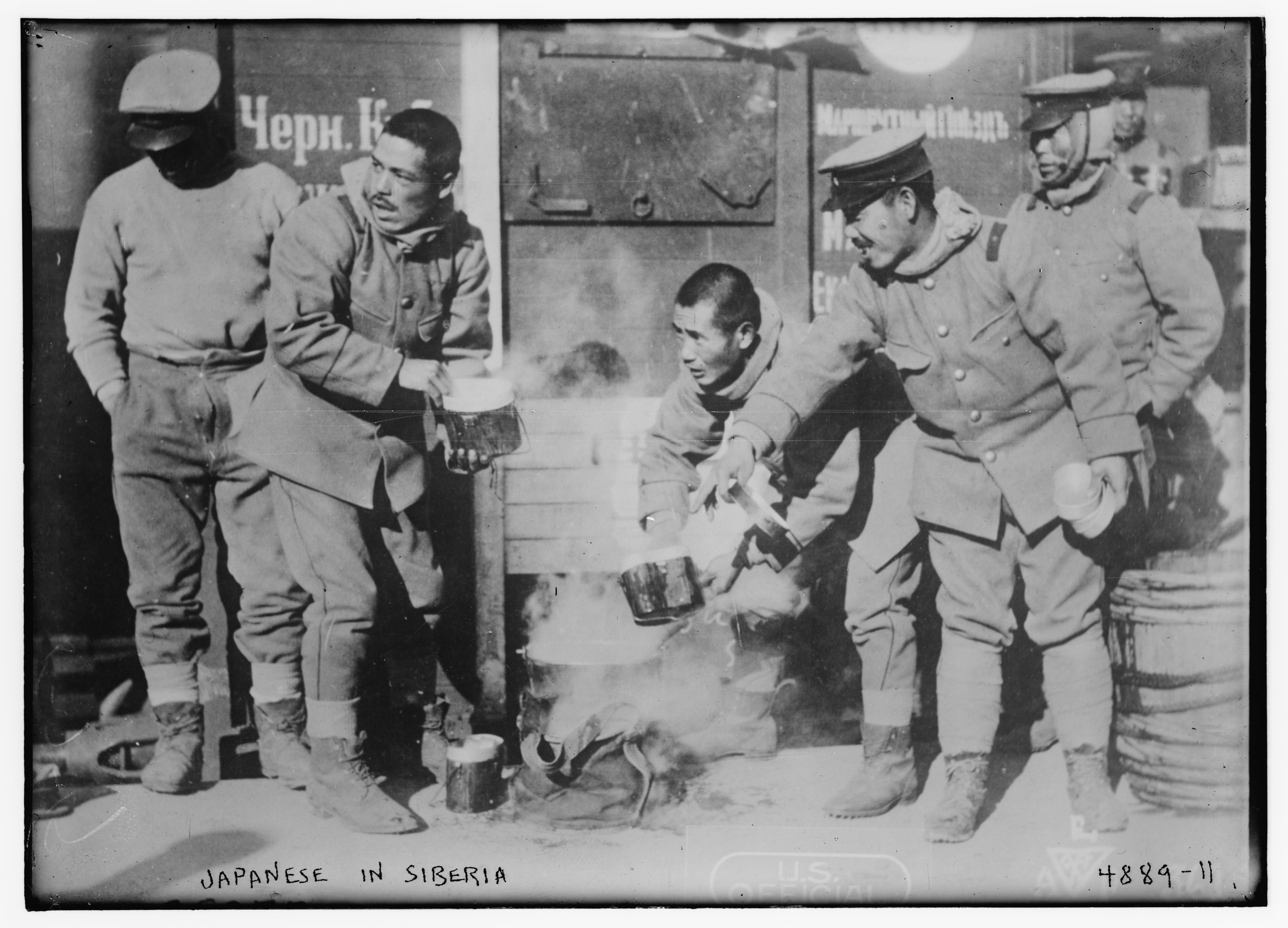
Japanese soldiers in Siberia (1918–1922).

The poor relations between the Soviet Union and Japan from the 1920s until the late 1940s originated in Japan's victory over imperial Russia, the predecessor state of the Soviet Union, in the Russo-Japanese War of 1904–05. During the Russian Civil War (1918–21), Japan (as a member of the Allied interventionist forces) occupied Vladivostok from 1918 until 1922, using as many as 70,000 troops.

Japan formally recognized the Soviet Union in January 1925 with the Soviet–Japanese Basic Convention. They agreed that the 1905 Treaty of Portsmouth (the treaty between the Russian Empire and Imperial Japan which ended the Russo-Japanese War) remained in force, while other agreements and treaties between the two countries should be re-examined. By concluding this agreement, Japan formally recognized the Soviet Union. Ratifications were exchanged in Beijing on February 26, 1925. The agreement was registered in League of Nations Treaty Series on May 20, 1925.

== 1917–1925: Sakhalin Island and the Kuril Islands ==
After Russia was defeated in 1905, Japan took control of southern Sakhalin Island and the Kuril Islands. In 1920, The Bolsheviks took over northern Sakhalin, but within months the Japanese captured it and began to exploit its oil, coal, and other resources. Under international pressure, the northern district of Sakhalin was transferred to the Soviet Union in 1925, but the Japanese retained a concession there. In 1945 the Soviets seized all of Sakhalin and the Kuril Islands.

== 1925–1930: Quiet cooperation ==
The early years following the establishment of diplomatic relation were characterized by calm, which was mainly the result of the partial restraint in the expansionist policies of the Japanese Empire prior to 1931, as well as the Soviet need to maintain trade and the temporary deterioration in Sino-Soviet relations around the period of the Sino-Soviet war in 1929.

In 1925, immediately following the establishment of relations, the Japanese government withdrew its forces from the northern part of Sakhalin, captured by the Japanese army during the Siberian intervention.

Following the restoration of diplomatic relations in 1925, the Soviet Embassy in Japan became the point of contact between Communist International (Comintern) and Japanese socialist revolutionaries. The Soviet Union and the Comintern provided financial support to the Japanese Communist Party and encouraged Japanese revolutionaries to study at the Communist University of the Toilers of the East in Moscow. Due to the Japanese Peace Preservation Law of 1925, the communist movement in Japan was heavily repressed, forcing many members to operate from abroad (such as in China or the United States) or face arrest. Sanzō Nosaka represented the JCP within the Comintern, spending time in Moscow before eventually aiding the Chinese Communist Party during World War II.

An important step during this period was the conclusion on January 23, 1928, of a Soviet-Japanese Fishery agreement, which permitted Japanese nationals to fish in the waters of the Pacific Ocean adjacent to the Soviet coastline. Ratifications were exchanged in Tokyo on May 23, 1928. The agreement was registered in League of Nations Treaty Series on September 5, 1928.

The USSR had approached Japan several times with proposals for a non-aggression pact, but Japan viewed these proposals unfavorably and prioritized the conclusion of treaties of commerce and resolution of outstanding economic issues. Prime Minister Tanaka Giichi deferred an early Soviet proposal of non-aggression pact, emphasizing that Japan’s priority was commerce and resolving economic issues.

== 1930–1945: Deteriorating relations and war ==
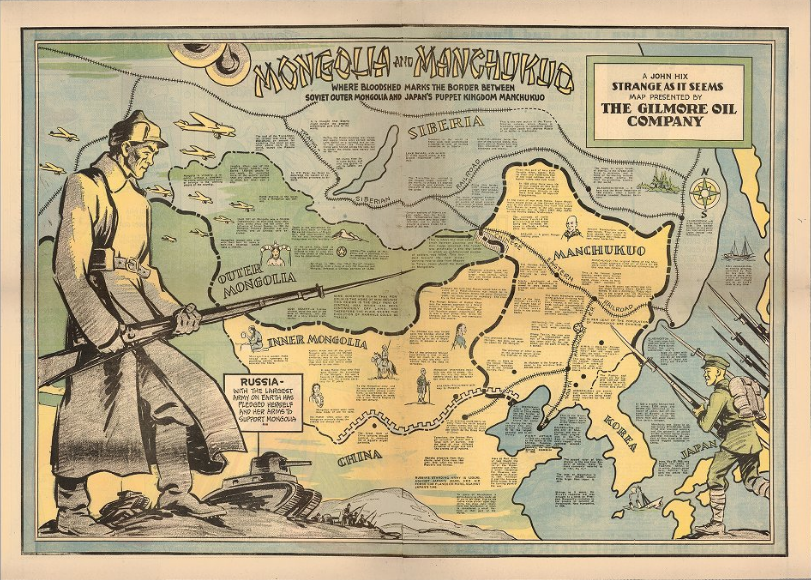
Soviet backed Communist Mongolia and Japan ruled Manchukuo

Beginning in 1930 amid deteriorating relations with Poland, Joseph Stalin became concerned about the possibility of a two-front war with Poland and Japan. In particular, he feared that Japan would encourage nomads in Soviet Central Asia to rebel against the Soviet Union's forced sedentarization policies. After the Japanese invasion of Manchuria and the establishment of the puppet state of Manchukuo in 1932, Japan turned its military interests to Soviet territories. Soviet-Japanese relations sharply deteriorated after 1936. This stemmed from the conclusion of the Anti-Comintern Pact between Japan and Nazi Germany in November 1936, which was designed as a defense against international communism.

In 1931–1932, The Soviet Union revived another proposal for Japan as its military frontier in Manchuria threatened Soviet interests. Ambassador Yoshizawa Kenkichi received suggestions from Foreign Minister Maxim Litvinov to negotiate a nonaggression pact. Japanese officials like Prime Minister Inukai Tsuyoshi and Minister of War Araki Sadao considered the proposal premature studied it cautiously, considering the proposal premature and largely skeptical.

The first major Soviet-Japanese border incident, the Battle of Lake Khasan (1938), happened in Primorye, not far from Vladivostok. Conflicts between the Japanese and the Soviets frequently happened on the border of Manchuria, escalating into an undeclared border war which was decided in the Battle of Khalkhin Gol (1939), which took place at the Mongolian-Manchurian border. The Soviet Union won decisively, and deterred Japan from any further aggression during World War II.

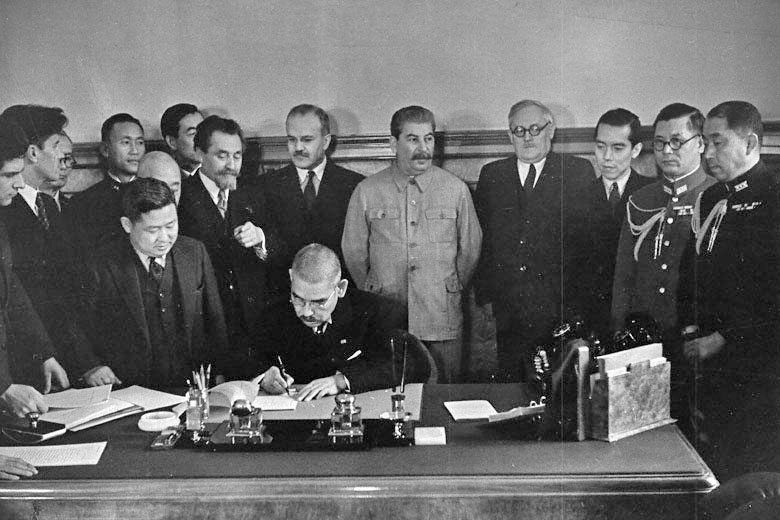
Japanese Foreign Minister Matsuoka signing the Soviet–Japanese Neutrality Pact (1941)

In 1941, two years after the border war, Japan and the Soviet Union signed a neutrality pact. Later in 1941, Japan would consider breaking the pact when Nazi Germany invaded the Soviet Union (Operation Barbarossa), but they did not, largely due to the defeat at Battle of Khalkhin Gol, even though Japan and Nazi Germany were part of the Tripartite Pact.

At Yalta in February 1945, Stalin promised Roosevelt that the USSR would enter the war against Japan 90 days after the defeat of Germany, which took place in May. It met that timetable by shifting large forces across Siberia. In April 1945, Moscow annulled the neutrality pact. The Soviet invasion of Manchuria began on August 8, 1945, after the atomic bombing of Hiroshima (August 6). The Soviet Union planned an invasion of Hokkaido, but it was never carried out because of opposition from the United States.

=== Richard Sorge: Invaluable spy ===
Richard Sorge (1895 – 7 November 1944) was a German journalist and Soviet military intelligence officer who was active before and during World War II and worked undercover as a German journalist in both Nazi Germany and the Empire of Japan. His codename was "Ramsay" (Russian: Рамза́й). A number of famous personalities considered him one of the most accomplished spies.

Sorge is most famous for his service in Japan in 1940 and 1941, when he provided information about Hitler's plan to attack the Soviet Union in 1941. Then, in mid-September 1941, he informed the Soviets that Japan would not attack the Soviet Union in the near future. A month later, Sorge was arrested in Japan for espionage. He was tortured, forced to confess, tried and hanged in November 1944. Stalin declined to intervene on his behalf with the Japanese. He was posthumously awarded the title of Hero of the Soviet Union in 1964.

== 1946–1960: Restoration of relations ==
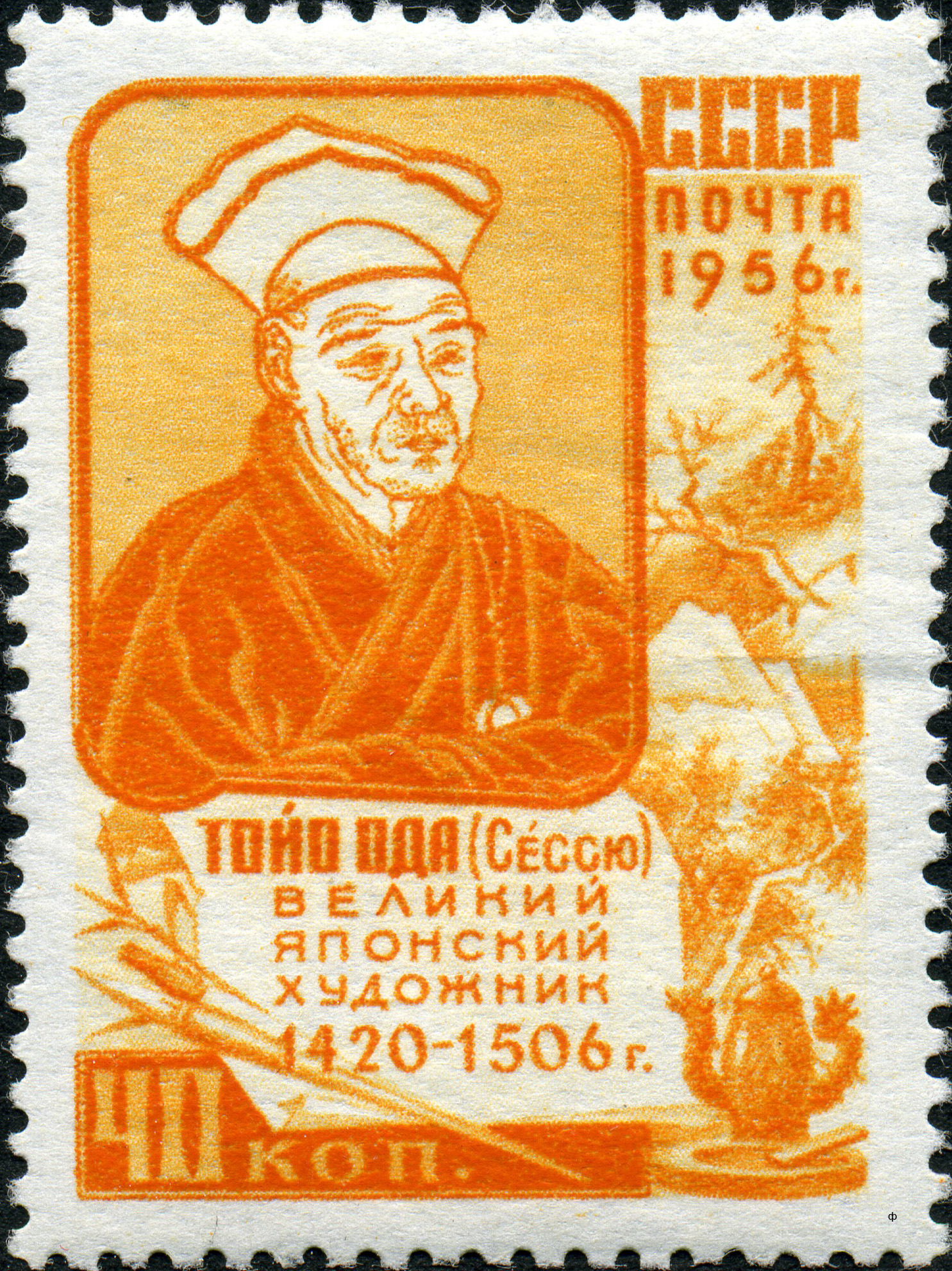
Japanese painter Sesshū Tōyō commemorated on a 1956 Soviet stamp

Due to the invasion, 56 islands of the Kuril chain, as well as the southern half of Sakhalin (i.e. the Northern Territories), were in 1946 incorporated into the Soviet Union. The USSR created a South-Sakhalin Province in the Khabarovsk Region of the Soviet Union. This annexation was never recognized by Japan and prevented the conclusion of a Soviet-Japanese World War II peace treaty and the establishment of closer relations between the two states. The Soviet Union refused to return these territories claiming that it feared that such a return would encourage China to push their own territorial claims against the Soviet Union. The Soviet Union used the islands as part of an antisubmarine warfare network guarding the mouth of the Sea of Okhotsk.

During the first half of the 1950s, other unsettled problems included Japanese fishing rights in the Sea of Okhotsk and off the coast of the Soviet maritime provinces and repatriation of Japanese prisoners of war, who were still being held in the Soviet Union. Negotiation of these issues broke down early in 1956 because of tension over territorial claims.

Negotiations resumed, however, and the Soviet Union and Japan signed a Joint Declaration on October 19, 1956, providing for the restoration of diplomatic relations and ending the war. The two parties also agreed to continue negotiations for a peace treaty, including territorial issues. In addition, the Soviet Union pledged to support Japan for UN membership and waive all World War II reparations claims. The Joint Declaration was accompanied by a trade protocol that granted reciprocal most-favored-nation treatment and provided for the development of trade.

Japan derived few apparent gains from the normalization of diplomatic relations. The second half of the 1950s saw an increase in cultural exchanges. Soviet propaganda, however, had little success in Japan, where it encountered a longstanding antipathy stemming from the Russo-Japanese rivalry in Korea, Manchuria, and China proper in the late nineteenth century, from the Russo-Japanese War of 1904–5; and from the Soviet declaration of war on Japan in the last days of World War II, in accordance with the Yalta agreement.

The Soviet Union sought to induce Japan to abandon its territorial claims by alternating threats and persuasion. As early as 1956, it hinted at the possibility of considering the return of the Habomai Islands and Shikotan if Japan abandoned its alliance with the United States. In 1960, the Soviet government warned Japan against signing the Treaty of Mutual Cooperation and Security with the United States, and after the treaty was signed, declared that it would not hand over the Habomai Islands and Shikotan under any circumstances unless Japan abrogated the treaty forthwith. In 1964, the Soviet Union offered to return these islands if the United States ended its military presence on Okinawa and the main islands of Japan.

== 1960s–1975: Improving relations ==
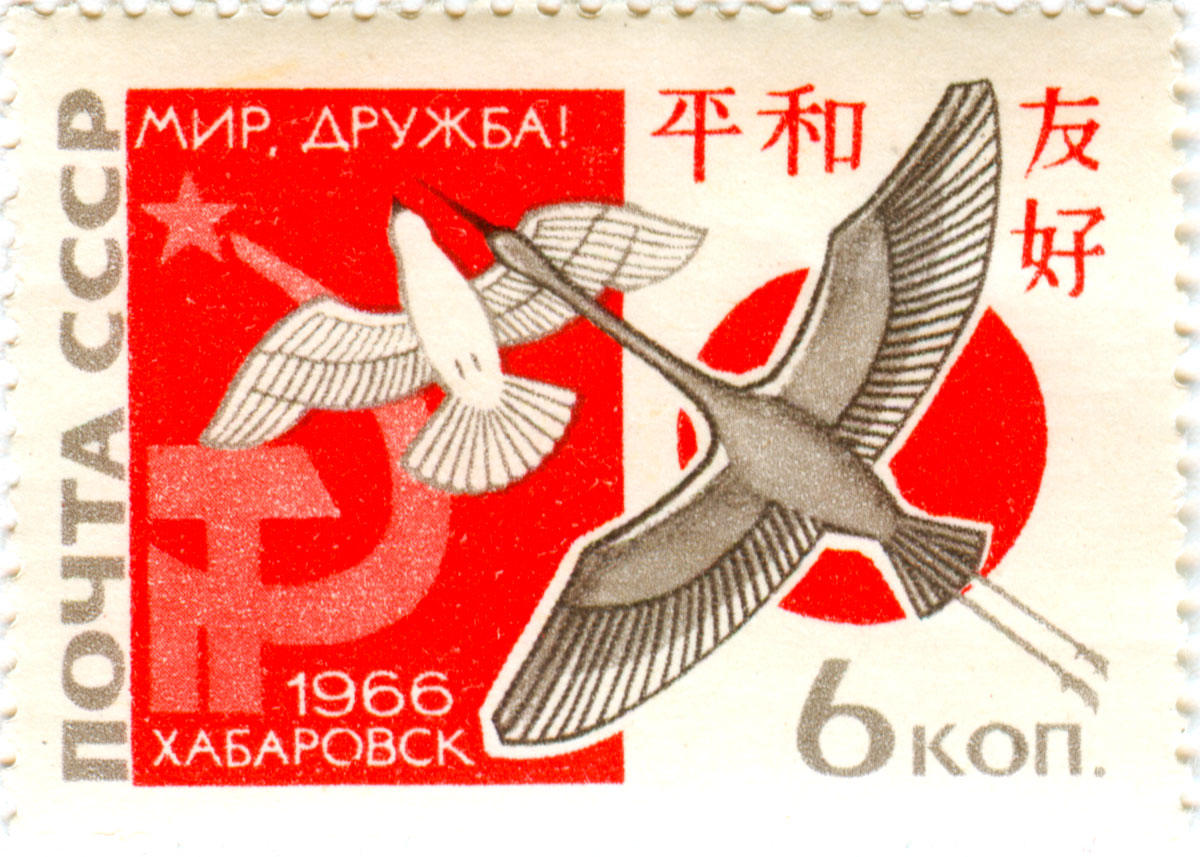
August 9, 1966. The second meeting of the Soviet-Japanese "peace and friendship" in Khabarovsk. Dove and crane - symbols of peace and friendship. State flags of the USSR and Japan. Post of USSR, 1966.

Despite divergence on the territorial question, on which neither side was prepared to give ground, Japan's relations with the Soviet Union improved appreciably after the mid-1960s. The Soviet government began to seek Japanese cooperation in its economic development plans, and the Japanese responded positively. The two countries signed a five-year trade agreement in January 1966 and a civil aviation agreement as well. The Sino-Soviet split also fundamentally reshaped Cold War geopolitics. As a result of Chinese antagonism and the split, the USSR began exploring closer ties with Japan starting around 1963, aiming to bolster its regional position in East Asia. A preliminary rapprochement sought to stabilize Soviet influence and counterbalance China creating tensions that influenced the Soviet Union to explore closer relations with Japan as a counterbalance.

During the period surrounding Sino-American diplomatic normalization ties and the second Indochina conflicts (primarily Vietnam War), Japan-USSR relations efforts by Moscow to balance alliances, Japan sought to maintain peaceful ties with the Soviet Union.

Economic cooperation expanded rapidly during the 1970s, despite an often strained political relationship. The two economies were complementary, for the Soviet Union needed Japan's capital, technology, and consumer goods, while Japan needed Soviet natural resources, such as oil, gas, coal, iron ore, and timber. By 1979 overall trade had reached US$4.4 billion annually and had made Japan, after the Federal Republic of Germany (West Germany), the Soviet Union's most important nonsocialist trading partner.

Japanese-Soviet political relations during the 1970s were characterized by the frequent exchange of high-level visits to explore the possibility of improving bilateral relations and by repeated discussions of a peace treaty, which were abortive because neither side was prepared to yield on the territorial issue. Minister of Foreign Affairs Andrei Gromyko of the Soviet Union visited Tokyo in January 1972—one month before United States President Nixon's historic visit to China—to reopen ministerial-level talks after a six-year lapse. Other high-level talks, including an October 1973 meeting between Prime Minister Tanaka Kakuei and Leonid I. Brezhnev, general secretary of the Communist Party of the Soviet Union, were held in Moscow during the next three years, but the deadlock on the territorial issue continued, and prospects for a settlement dimmed. Moscow began to propose a treaty of friendship and goodwill as an interim step while peace treaty talks were continued. This proposal was firmly rejected by Japan.

== 1975–1990: Strains on relations ==
After 1975, the Soviet Union began openly to warn that a Japanese peace treaty with China might jeopardize Soviet–Japan relations. In January 1976, Gromyko again visited Tokyo to resume talks on the peace treaty. When the Japanese again refused to budge on the territorial question, Gromyko, according to the Japanese, offered to return two of the Soviet-held island areas—the Habomai Islands and Shikotan—if Japan would sign a treaty of goodwill and cooperation. He also reportedly warned the Japanese, in a reference to China, against "forces which come out against the relaxation of tension and which try to complicate relations between states, including our countries."

The signing of the Sino-Japanese peace treaty in mid-1978 was a major setback to Japanese-Soviet relations. Despite Japanese protestations that the treaty's antihegemony clause was not directed against any specific country, Moscow saw it as placing Tokyo with Washington and Beijing firmly in the anti-Soviet camp. Officially, both sides continued to express the desire for better relations, but Soviet actions served only to alarm and alienate the Japanese side. The 1980s Soviet military buildup in the Pacific was a case in point.

In 1979, Kenji Miyamoto, as Chairman of the Japanese Communist Party, engaged in high-level dialogue with the Soviet leadership, including signing joint statements in Moscow with CPSU Secretary General Leonid Brezhnev, reflecting Cold War-era communist solidarity and Japan–Soviet party relations.

The 1980s saw a decided hardening in Japanese attitudes toward the Soviet Union. Japan was pressed by the United States to do more to check the expansion of Soviet power in the developing world following the December 1979 Soviet invasion of Afghanistan. It responded by cutting off contacts beneficial to the Soviet regime and providing assistance to "front line" states, such as Pakistan and Thailand. Under Prime Minister Yasuhiro Nakasone, Japan worked hard to demonstrate a close identity of views with the Reagan administration on the "Soviet threat". Japan steadily built up its military forces, welcomed increases in United States forces in Japan and the western Pacific, and pledged close cooperation to deal with the danger posed by Soviet power.

This economic cooperation was interrupted by Japan's decision in 1980 to participate in sanctions against the Soviet Union for its invasion of Afghanistan and by its actions to hold in abeyance a number of projects being negotiated, to ban the export of some high-technology items, and to suspend Siberian development loans. Subsequently, Japanese interest in economic cooperation with the Soviet Union waned as Tokyo found alternative suppliers and remained uncertain about the economic viability and political stability of the Soviet Union under Gorbachev. Japan-Soviet trade in 1988 was valued at nearly US$6 billion.

Although public and media opinion remained skeptical of the danger to Japan posed by Soviet forces in Asia, there was strong opposition in Japan to Moscow's refusal to accede to Japan's claims to the Northern Territories, known to the Japanese as Etorofu and Kunashiri, at the southern end of the Kuril Island chain, and the smaller island of Shikotan and the Habomai Islands, northeast of Hokkaidō, which were seized by the Soviets in the last days of World War II. The stationing of Soviet military forces on the islands gave tangible proof of the Soviet threat, and provocative maneuvers by Soviet air and naval forces in Japanese-claimed territory served to reinforce Japanese official policy of close identification with a firm United States-backed posture against Soviet power. In 1979, the Japanese government specifically protested a buildup in Soviet forces in Etorofu, Kunashiri, and Shikotan.

The advent of the Mikhail Gorbachev regime in Moscow in 1985 saw a replacement of hard-line Soviet government diplomats who were expert in Asian affairs with more flexible spokespersons calling for greater contact with Japan. Gorbachev took the lead in promising new initiatives in Asia, but the substance of Soviet policy changed more slowly. In particular, throughout the rest of the 1980s, Soviet officials still seemed uncompromising regarding the Northern Territories, Soviet forces in the western Pacific still seemed focused on and threatening to Japan, and Soviet economic troubles and lack of foreign exchange made prospects for Japan-Soviet Union economic relations appear poor. By 1990, Japan appeared to be the least enthusiastic of the major Western-aligned developed countries in encouraging greater contacts with and assistance to the Soviet Union.

Changes in Soviet policy carried out under Gorbachev beginning in the mid-1980s, including attempts at domestic reform and the pursuit of détente with the United States and Western Europe, elicited generally positive Japanese interest, but the Japanese government held that the Soviet Union had not changed its policies on issues vital to Japan. The government stated that it would not conduct normal relations with the Soviet Union until Moscow returned the Northern Territories. The government and Japanese business leaders stated further that Japanese trade with and investment in the Soviet Union would not grow appreciably until the Northern Territories issue has been resolved.

== 1990s: Dissolution of the USSR ==
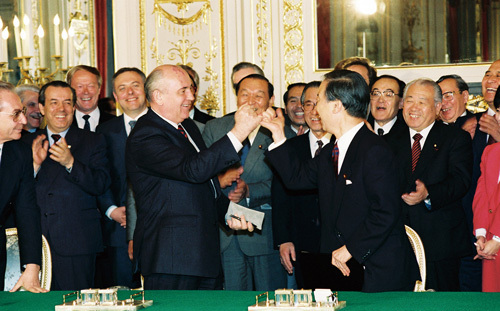
Prime Minister of Japan Toshiki Kaifu and President of the Soviet Union Mikhail Gorbachev

The Soviet government also stepped up its diplomacy toward Japan with the announcement in 1990 that Gorbachev would visit Japan in 1991. Soviet officials asserted that their government would propose disarmament talks with Japan and might make more proposals on the Northern Territories in connection with the visit. Observers believed that Gorbachev might propose a package dealing with the islands, arms reduction, and economic cooperation. In January 1990, the Japanese Ministry of Foreign Affairs shifted its position, which previously had rejected negotiations with the Soviet Union on arms reductions, indicating that Japan would be willing to negotiate. Ministry officials stated that the government would formulate policy on arms reduction in close coordination with the United States.

The government of Boris Yeltsin took power in Russia in late 1991 when the Soviet Union was dissolved. Once again, Moscow took a stand in firm opposition to returning the disputed territories to Japan. Although Japan joined with the Group of Seven industrialized nations in providing some technical and financial assistance to Russia, relations between Japan and Russia remained cold. In September 1992, Russian president Boris Yeltsin postponed a scheduled visit to Japan. The visit finally took place in October 1993. During the visit, although various substantive issues, including the Northern Territories and the signing of a peace treaty, were discussed, no significant improvement was seen in Japan-Russia relations. On July 30, 1998, the newly elected Japanese prime minister Keizō Obuchi had focused on major issues: signing a peace treaty with Russia, and reviving the Japanese economy from the 1997 Asian financial crisis. Prior to his death, his policy with the Russian Federation eluded implementation and relations between the two nations remained without a state of peace.

== Economic relations ==
Complicating economic relations between Japan and the Soviet Union were the Cold War realities and the above-mentioned territorial disputes.

Imports from the Soviet Union declined during the first half of the 1980s, from nearly US$1.9 billion to less than US$1.5 billion, and then recovered to almost US$3.4 billion by 1990, representing modest growth for the entire period. Exports to the Soviet Union stagnated and then grew modestly, to over US$3.1 billion in 1988, before declining to US$2.6 billion in 1990.

Commercial relations with the Soviet Union also paralleled strategic developments. Japan was very interested in Siberian raw materials in the early 1970s as prices were rising and détente persisted. The challenges to détente, especially the invasion of Afghanistan in 1979, and falling raw material prices put strong constraints on Japan's trade and investment relations with the Soviet Union. Only after Soviet policy began to change under Mikhail Gorbachev's leadership, beginning in 1985, did Japanese trade resume its growth.

Japan's trade was also constrained by the Coordinating Committee for Multilateral Export Controls (CoCom), which controlled exports of strategic high technology. In 1987 the United States discovered that Toshiba Machine Tool had shipped machine tools on the restricted list to the Soviet Union, tools used to manufacture quieter submarine propellers. Although the Japanese government moved reluctantly to punish Toshiba (and the United States imposed sanctions on Toshiba exports to the United States in response), the outcome was stronger surveillance and punishment for CoCom violations in Japan.

== Ambassadors ==
=== Soviet Union's ambassadors in Japan ===
- Vladimir Vinogradov – 1962–1966

=== Japan's ambassadors in the Soviet Union ===
- Mamoru Shigemitsu (1936–1938) negotiated with Soviet Foreign Commissar Maxim Litvinoff about the 1937 Amur River incident and about the border dispute concerning several uninhabited islands.
- Shigenori Togo (1938–1940), negotiated the border agreement signed on June 9, 1940.
- Yoshitsugu Tatekawa (1940–1942), concluded the 1941 Neutrality pact.
- Naotake Sato (1942–1945), was in 1945 informed that the Neutrality pact would not be renewed.

== See also ==
- Relations between the Empire of Japan and the Russian Empire (1855–1922)
- Siberian intervention
- Japan–Russia relations (1991–present)
- Hokushin-ron
- Foreign relations of Japan
- Foreign relations of Russia
- Foreign relations of the Soviet Union
- Monument to the Victory over Japan
