= Monument to the Victory over Japan =

Russian World War II monument in Khabarovsk

Coordinates: 48.4719°N 135.0555°E

- Победа на Востоке
- Interactive map of Monument to the Victory over Japan
- Location: Khabarovsk
- Designer: Ilya Khrabry
- Fabricator: Vadim Frolov
- Builder: Denis Stritovich
- Type: War memorial
- Material: Bronze
- Width: 3,5 meters (soldier), ~100 meters (memorial square)
- Height: 15 meters
- Weight: 30 tonnes
- Beginning date: 2025
- Completion date: August 2026
- Opening date: 4 September 2026
- Dedicated to: The victory over Japan and the end of World War II

The monument to the Victory over Japan (full name in Russian: памятник, посвящённый Победе над милитаристской Японией и окончанию Второй мировой войны, lit. 'monument to the victory over militarist Japan and the end of World War II'), also less formally known as "The Victory in the East" (Russian: Победа на Востоке) is a monument that was unveiled in Khabarovsk, Russia on 4 September 2026.

== Description ==
Japanese Imperial seal

The monument is installed on the Amur river embankment. The central part of the monument is a 15-metre bronze figure of a Soviet Army soldier smashing a Japanese border stone with the symbol of chrysanthemum, a symbol of Japan. The stone bears inscriptions (written from right to left); above the chrysanthemum: 大日本帝國, Dai Nippon Teikoku, 'Great Empire of Japan' below: 境界, kyokai, 'border'.

The figure of the soldier is surrounded by stellae dedicated to the 1st and 2nd Far Eastern Fronts, the Transbaikal Front, the Pacific Fleet, and the Amur Flotilla that were involved in the Manchurian Strategic Offensive Operation/August Storm of 1945.

The authors are sculptor Denis Stritovich (Денис Стритович), architect Vadim Frolov (Вадим Фролов), and artist Ilya Khrabry (Илья Храбрый).

== Political controversy ==
On the next day, Toshimitsu Motegi of the Foreign Ministry of Japan stated that the monument depicting the destruction of a chrysanthemum "is unacceptable and extremely regrettable in terms of Japanese national sentiment", and the statue "is not constructive in relation to Japan". Earlier Japan requested through diplomatic channels to cease the installation of the monument.

Nikolay Ovsiyenko from Vladimir Putin's executive office replied that the chrysanthemum is also a symbol of militaristic Japan, and the border stone is an exact replica of the one installed on Sakhalin.

== See also ==
- Victory over Japan Day
- Liberation Monument (Pyongyang), Korea
