= Soviet–Japanese Joint Declaration of 1956 =

1956 restoration of diplomatic relations between the USSR and Japan

Joint Declaration between Japan and the Soviet Union
Japan-Soviet joint declaration Japan-Soviet diplomatic joint declaration
- Full text of the Declaration in French
- Context: Declaration of the end of the war between Japan and Soviet Union, Declaration of peace and friendly relations between the two countries
- Signed: 19 October 1956
- Location: Moscow, Soviet Union
- Effective: 12 December 1956
- Parties: Japan; Soviet Union
- Language: Japanese and Russian

Full text
- ru:Советско-японская декларация 1956 года at Wikisource

The Soviet Union did not sign the 1951 Treaty of Peace with Japan, which had re‑established peaceful relations between most other Allied Powers and Japan. On 19 October 1956, Japan and the Soviet Union signed a Joint Declaration providing for the end of the state of war and for the restoration of diplomatic relations between both countries. They also agreed to continue negotiations for a peace treaty. In addition, the Soviet Union pledged to support Japan for UN membership and to waive all World War II reparations claims. The joint declaration was accompanied by a trade protocol, which granted reciprocal most favored nation status and provided for the development of trade. Japan derived few apparent gains from the normalization of diplomatic relations. The second half of the 1950s saw an increase in cultural exchanges.

== Territorial provisions ==
The Joint Declaration provided in Article 9 for the continuation of negotiations for the conclusion of a peace treaty after the restoration of diplomatic relations between the countries and further stipulated that "in this connexion, the Union of Soviet Socialist Republics, desiring to meet the wishes of Japan and taking into consideration the interests of the Japanese State, agrees to transfer to Japan the Habomai Islands and the island of Shikoton [sic], the actual transfer of these islands to Japan to take place after the conclusion of a Peace Treaty between the Union of Soviet Socialist Republics and Japan." At the time, the United States threatened to keep the Ryukyu Islands if Japan gave away the other islands, which prevented the negotiation of the promised treaty.

Moreover, the clause was supposedly based upon agreement between the two nations, but each came to interpret it differently. The Soviet Union maintained that the territorial problem had been closed and that territorial demarcation would not be discussed beyond the promised transfer of two islands. When the Japanese tried to include a passage "including territorial issue" in a sentence regarding continuation of the negotiations, the Soviets refused, explicitly stating that it did so precisely to avoid interpretation that would suggest other "territorial questions" beyond Shikotan-Habomai issue. The Japanese agreed to drop the expression but had a different interpretation arrived anyway. When the final agreement had been reached on the terms of the Joint Declaration, the Japanese delegation decided to interpret it as including a discussion of the territorial problem in the future peace negotiation by interpreting the declaration jointly with "Hatoyama-Bulganin letters" and "Matsumoto-Gromyko letters".

Exchanged before the final negotiations on the declaration, they intended to confirm the conditions for under the so-called "Adenauer Formula" in which diplomatic relations were to be restored without signing a peace treaty and the territorial problem was to be shelved for future negotiation. The formula did not pass, however, since in spite of preliminary agreement with the Soviets to shelve the territorial issue, Japan raised it at the negotiations and managed to get their territorial clause in the declaration but "interpreted in such a manner as to preserve the plenipotentiaries' face at home": "Habomais and Shikotan were promised in the Joint Declaration, and the question of Kunashiri and Etorofu was to be settled during negotiations for a peace treaty." The disagreement between "two-island transfer" stipulated in the 1956 declaration and Japan's persistent demand of "four-island return" became the cornerstone for the continuation of the Kuril Islands dispute in the Soviet and post-Soviet years.

== Legacy ==
On 14 November 2004, Russian foreign minister Sergei Lavrov said in a NTV interview that the Russian Federation, which is the successor state of the Soviet Union, recognized the Declaration of 1956, and was ready to have territorial talks with Japan on that basis and was followed by Russian president Vladimir Putin the next day. However, the dispute persists, no peace treaty has yet been signed, and the islands remain under Russian administration.

== See also ==
- Japan–Soviet Union relations
