= Lesser Kuril Chain =

Part of the Kuril Islands

Coordinates: 43°37′N 146°23′E

Map of Kuril Islands in which the Lesser Kurils are shown in red.

The Lesser Kuril Chain (Russian: Малая Курильская гряда, Japanese: 小(しょう)千島(ちしま)列島(れっとう), Shō Chishima Rettō; Japanese pronunciation: [ɕo̞ː t͡ɕiɕima̠ ɾe̞t̚to̞ː]), is an island chain in the northwestern Pacific Ocean. The islands are administered as part of Yuzhno-Kurilsky District of Sakhalin Oblast, Russia, and many sources consider the chain to be geographically part of the Kuril Islands. However, the Japanese government claims that these islands are not part of the Kuril Islands and are instead minor islands of Hokkaido.

The Lesser Kuril Chain lies northeast of the Nemuro Peninsula in Hokkaido, near the southwestern end of the Greater Kuril Chain, from which it is separated by the South Kuril Strait. It consists of Shikotan, the Habomai Islands and several small islands lying close to the Shikotan. The chain parallels, but is much shorter than, the Greater Kuril Chain, from which the Lesser Kurils lie to the south-east.

The length of the Lesser Kuril island chain is about 100 km (62 mi), and the total land area is 360.85 km^{2} (139.32 sq mi). The islands' highest point is a mountain summit on Shikotan, 412 m (1,352 ft) above sea level.

The islands of the chain, along with neighbouring Kunashir, have been recognised as Important Bird Areas (IBAs) by BirdLife International because they support populations of various threatened bird species, including many waterbirds, seabirds and waders.

Name	Area, km^{2}	Maximum height, m	Latitude	Longitude
Lesser Kuril Chain
Shikotan	264,13	412	43°48'	146°45'
Polonsky Island	11,57	16	43°38'	146°19'
Oskolki	0,2	38	43°35'	146°25'
Zeleny Island	58,72	24	43°30'	146°08'
Tanfilyev Island	12,92	15	43°26'	145°55'
Yuri	10,32	44	43°25'	146°04'
Dyomin Islands	0,7	34	43°25'	146°10'
Anuchin Island	2,35	33	43°22'	146°00'

== See also ==
- Greater Kuril Chain
