= Greater Kuril Chain =

Part of the Kuril Islands

Coordinates: 47°17′N 151°30′E

Greater Kuril Chain (Russian: Большая Курильская гряда) - a part of the Kuril Islands - is a group of islands in the Pacific Ocean. It includes North Kurils, Iturup and Kunashir.

At its south western end, the Greater Kuril Chain is separated from the Lesser Kuril Chain by the South Kuril Strait. The maximum altitude in the Greater Kuril Chain is 2339m, on (Atlasov Island).

Length - 1200 km. Total Area - 10,100 km^{2}.

Greater Kuril Chain is part of Sakhalin Oblast of Russia. In the southern group of islands, Iturup and Kunashir are under Russian control, but this is disputed by Japan.

Name	Area, km²	Maximum height, m	Latitude	Longitude
Northern group
Atlasov Island	150	2339	50°52'	155°34'
Shumshu	388	189	50°45'	156°21'
Paramushir	2053	1816	50°23'	155°41'
Antsiferov Island	7	747	50°12'	154°59'
Makanrushi	49	1169	49°46'	154°26'
Onekotan	425	1324	49°27'	154°46'
Kharimkotan	68	1157	49°07'	154°32'
Chirinkotan	6	724	48°59'	153°29'
Ekarma	30	1170	48°57'	153°57'
Shiashkotan	122	934	48°49'	154°06'
Middle group
Raikoke	4,6	551	48°17'	153°15'
Matua (island)	52	1446	48°05'	153°13'
Rasshua	67	948	47°45'	153°01'
Ushishir	5	388	—	—
Ryponkicha	1,3	121	47°32'	152°50'
Yankicha	3,7	388	47°31'	152°49'
Ketoy	73	1166	47°20'	152°31'
Simushir	353	1539	46°58'	152°00'
Broutona	7	800	46°43'	150°44'
Chyornye Bratya	37	749	—	—
Chirpoy	21	691	46°30'	150°55'
Brat Chirpoyev	16	749	46°28'	150°50'
Southern group
Urup	1450	1426	45°54'	149°59'
Iturup	3200	1634	45°00'	147°53'
Kunashir	1490	1819	44°05'	145°59'

== See also ==
- Lesser Kuril Chain
