= Polonsky Island =

Uninhabited island in the Kuril Island chain

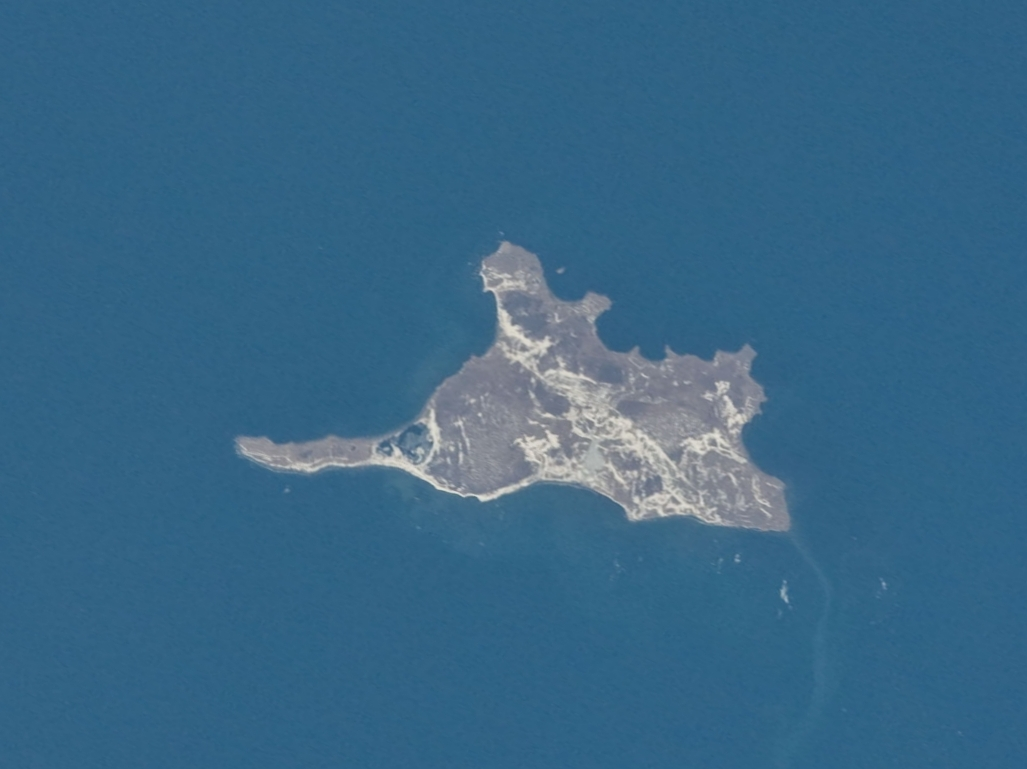
Polonsky Island in 2010, as seen from space; 43.631°N 146.326°E

Polonsky Island (Russian: Полонского; Japanese: 多楽島 Taraku-to), or Polonskogo, is an unpopulated island in the Habomai Islands in the southern part of the Lesser Kuril Islands which administratively belongs to Yuzhno-Kurilsky District of Sakhalin Oblast, in Russia. However, the Habomai Islands, together with Iturup, Kunashir and Shikotan, are claimed by Japan. Polonsky island got its name from the Russian explorer and geographer Aleksandr Semyonovich Polonsky. The island had a small Japanese population for several decades, ending during World War II.

== Geography ==
The island has an area of 12 km^{2}, is flat, with a maximum height of 16 metres (52 ft); it is green and marshy. Its waters are rich in fish, particularly some species of salmon, cod and crabs and it is part of the territory of the Kurils Nature Reserve.

Polonsky Island is separated from Shikotan by the Spanberg Strait, to the southeast are the Oskolki islets. The island is separated from Zelyony Island, 11 kilometres (6.8 mi) southwest, by the Polonskogo Strait.
