= Yuri Island =

Island in Sakhalin Oblast, Russia

Yuri
Native name: Юрий 勇留島
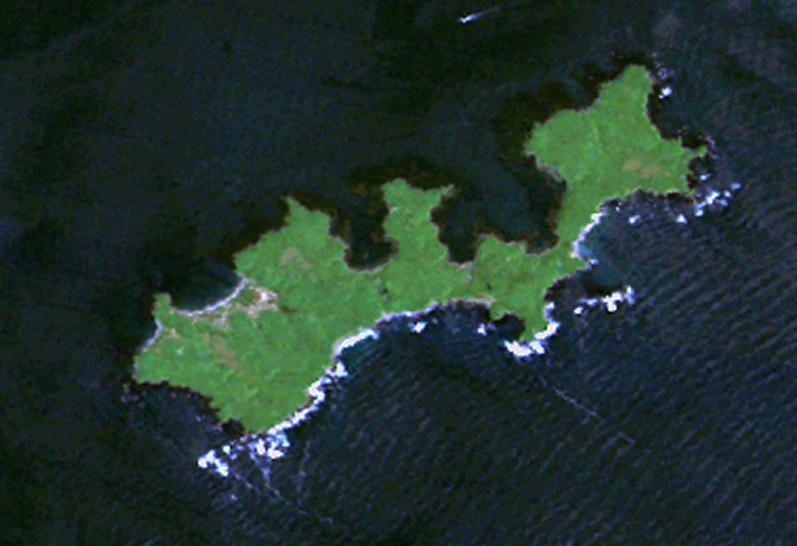
- Landsat picture of Yuri Island
- Interactive map of Yuri

Geography
- Location: North Pacific
- Coordinates: 43°25′11″N 146°04′11″E
- Archipelago: Kuril Islands
- Area: 10 km^{2} (3.9 sq mi)

Administration
- none under international law (Controlled by Russia)

Demographics
- Population: 0 (2010)
- Ethnic groups: Ainu, Japanese (formerly)

Yuri (Russian: Юрий, Japanese: 勇留島, romanized: Yuri-to, Ainu: ウリル, romanized: Uriru) is an uninhabited island in the Habomai Islands sub-group of the Kuril Islands chain in the south of the Sea of Okhotsk, northwest Pacific Ocean. The island is uninhabited from 1945 after the Soviet invasion of the Kuril Islands and deportation of Japanese to Hokkaido. It is currently administered as part of Yuzhno-Kurilsky District, Sakhalin Oblast of the Russian Federation. Its name is derived from the Ainu language word for cormorant.

== History ==
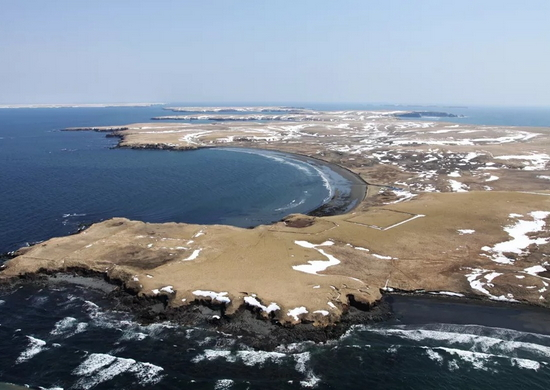
Yuri Island

Russian administered Yuzhno-Kurilsky District. The bottom left of the red-shaded area is the Habomai Islands, of which Yuri is one of them. Grey area is Hokkaido.

Yuri was originally uninhabited. In 1799, under the Tokugawa shogunate of Japan, a trading post and settlement was established on the island by the villages of Akkeshi and Nemuro as a base for fishermen, and for trade with the Ainu, the native peoples of the Kurils, Sakhalin and Hokkaidō. Administration of the island came under the village of Habomai in Hokkaido during the Meiji period, and immediately before World War II, the population of the island was 501 people, mostly engaged in commercial fishing.

During the Invasion of the Kuril Islands by the Soviet Union after the end of World War II, the island was seized without resistance. In 1945, the Evacuation of Karafuto and Kuriles see its native inhabitants being deported to Hokkaido and the island was uninhabited except for Soviet Border Troops until they were withdrawn upon the dissolution of the Soviet Union in 1991. The island is now uninhabited and is administered as part of the Yuzhno-Kurilsky District, Sakhalin Oblast of the Russian Federation.

== See also ==
- Kuril Islands dispute
- Evacuation of Karafuto and Kuriles
