= Urup (disambiguation) =

Urup is one of the Kuril Islands north of Japan.

Urup may also refer to:

- Urup Strait, separating Urup island from Chyornye Bratya islands
- Urup, Afghanistan
- Urup (river), a river in North Caucasus, Russia
- Urup (village), a former urban-type settlement in the Karachay–Cherkess Republic, Russia; since 1997—a village
