= Anuchina =

Island in the Habomai Islands

Anuchin Island
Native name: Анучина Akiyuri
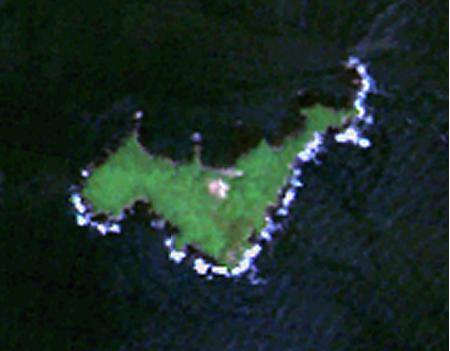
- Landsat picture of Anuchina Island
- Interactive map of Anuchin Island

Geography
- Location: North Pacific
- Coordinates: 43°21′59.1″N 146°0′21″E
- Archipelago: Kuril Islands
- Area: 5 km^{2} (1.9 sq mi)

Administration
- nothing under international law (Controlled by Russia)

Demographics
- Population: 0 (2010)
- Ethnic groups: Ainu, Japanese (formerly)

Anuchin Island (Russian: Анучина, Japanese: 秋勇留島, romanized: Akiyuri-to, Ainu: アキ・ユリ, romanized: Aki-Yuri) is an uninhabited island in the Habomai Islands sub-group of the Kuril Islands chain in the south of the Sea of Okhotsk, northwest Pacific Ocean. Named after Dmitry Anuchin, Russian anthropologist, ethnographist and archaeologist. Island's Japanese name is derived from the Ainu language.

== History ==
Anuchina was originally uninhabited. In 1799, under the Tokugawa shogunate of Japan, a trading post and settlement was established on the island by the villages of Akkeshi and Nemuro as a base for fishermen, and for trade with the Ainu, the native peoples of the Kurils, Sakhalin and Hokkaidō. Administration of the island came under the village of Habomai in Hokkaido during the Meiji period. The inhabitants of the island were mostly engaged in commercial fishing for Pollock and harvesting konbu.

During the Invasion of the Kuril Islands by the Soviet Union after the end of World War II, the island was seized without resistance. In 1945, its native inhabitants were deported to Hokkaido and the island was uninhabited except for Soviet Border Troops until they were withdrawn upon the dissolution of the Soviet Union in 1991. The island is now uninhabited and is administered as part of the Sakhalin Oblast of the Russian Federation.

The offshore islets of Kuril islands mostly remained unnamed during the Soviet era. The Russian Geographical Society made an expedition to the area in 2012 to generate ideas for naming further five islets which were officially given Russian names in 2017. One of them, Derevyanko, is part of Anuchina's offshore islets.

== See also ==
- Kuril Islands dispute
