= Habomai Islands =

Disputed group of islets in the Kuril Islands

Disputed islands Native name: Острова Хабомаи (Russian); 歯舞群島 (Japanese); ハアプオマイ (Ainu)
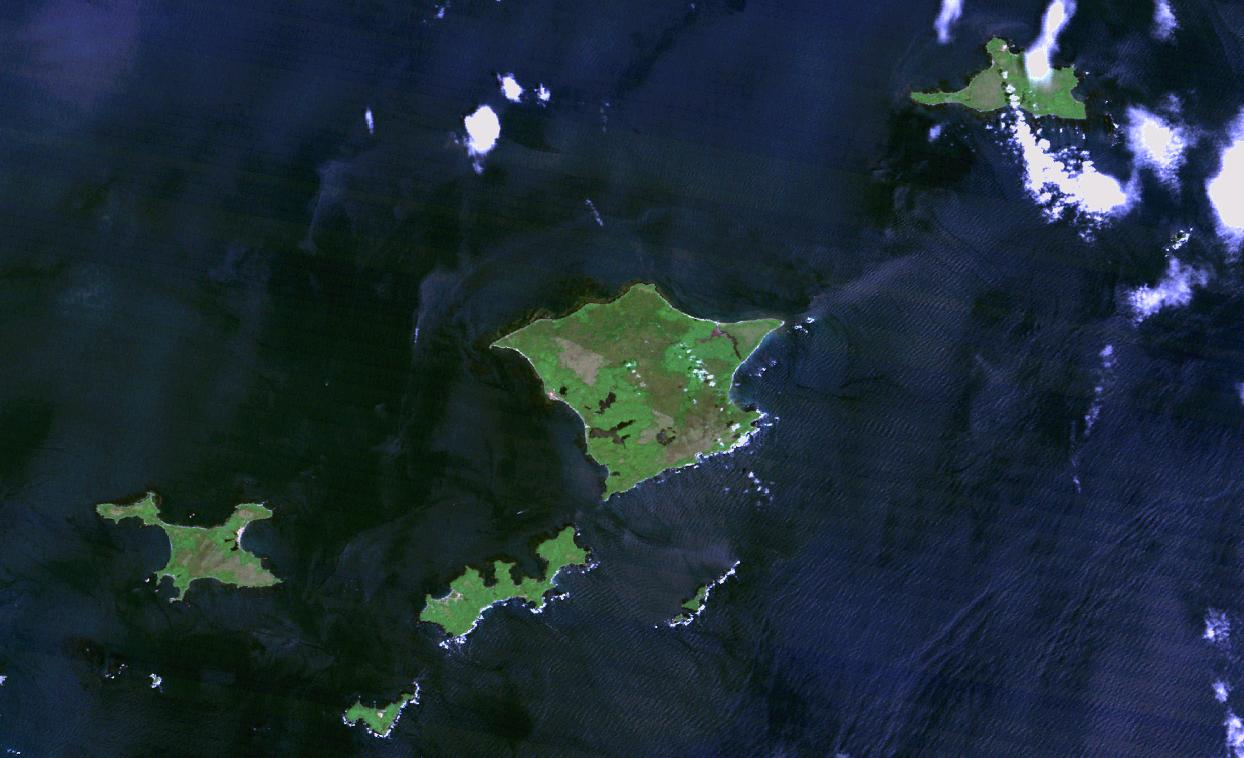
- Habomai Islands from space

- Location within Russia

Geography
- Location: Pacific Ocean
- Coordinates: 43°30′N 146°8′E
- Archipelago: Kuril Islands
- Total islands: 10 + several rocks
- Area: 100 km^{2} (39 sq mi)

Administration
- Russia
- Federal subject: Sakhalin Oblast
- District: Yuzhno-Kurilsky

Claimed by
- Japan
- Prefecture: Hokkaido
- Subprefecture: Nemuro

Demographics
- Population: 0

The Habomai Islands (Note: Russian: Острова Хабомаи, romanized: Ostrova Khabomai; Japanese: 歯舞群島, romanized: Habomai guntō; from Ainu: ハ・アプ・オマ・イ, romanized: ha-ap-oma-i, lit. 'small island that appears when the drift ice retreats') are a group of uninhabited islets (excluding the Russian guards stationed there) in the southernmost Kuril Islands. The islands have been under Soviet/Russian administration since the 1945 invasion of the Kuril Islands by the Soviet Union near the end of World War II. However, together with Iturup (Etorofu), Kunashir (Kunashiri), and Shikotan, the islands are claimed by Japan.

== Etymology ==
The English name Habomai and Russian name Khabomai (Хабомаи) are derived from the Japanese name Habomai (歯舞群), which itself comes from the Ainu ha-ap-oma-i (ハアプオマイ), which means "small island that appears when the drift ice retreats".

== History ==
Russian administered Yuzhno-Kurilsky District. The bottom left of the red-shaded area is the Habomai Islands. The dark grey area is Hokkaido, while the light grey area is the Kamchatka Peninsula.

Map including Habomai Shotō (DMA, 1990)

In the seventeenth century the Matsumae clan made efforts to administer the islands; by 1644 the islands had been mapped as Japanese territories.

In 1732 the islands were mapped during the Russian Great Eastern Expedition.

The Treaty of Shimoda, signed by Russia and Japan in 1855, recognised Japanese ownership of Iturup, Kunashir, Shikotan, and the Habomai Islands.

The Habomai Islands were occupied by Soviet forces in the last few days of World War II. The islands were eventually annexed by the Soviet Union, which deported all the island residents to Japan. Moscow claimed the islands as part of a war-time agreement between the Allies (Yalta Agreement), which provided for the transfer of the Chishima (Kurile) Islands to the USSR in return for its participation in the Pacific War. However, Japan maintains that the Habomai Islands are not part of the Kuriles and are in fact part of Hokkaido prefecture. On May 26, 1955, the United States submitted an application for proceedings against the Soviet Union. As part of the proceedings, the United States questioned the validity of the Soviet Union's claim to the Habomai Islands.

In 1956, after difficult negotiations, the Soviet Union agreed to cede the Habomai to Japan, along with Shikotan, after the conclusion of a peace treaty between the two countries. As the treaty was never concluded, the islands remained under Soviet jurisdiction. However, the promise of a two-island solution (for the purpose of simplicity, the Habomai islets count as one island) has been renewed in the Soviet-Japanese, and later Russo-Japanese negotiations. Formerly home to a Japanese fishing community, the islands are now uninhabited except for the Russian border guard outpost.

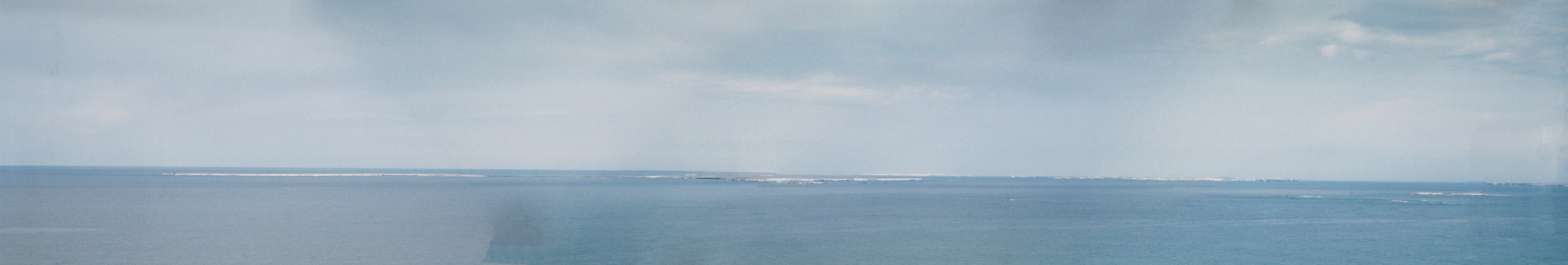
View of the Habomai Islands from Cape Nosappu (March 26, 2005).

== List of islands ==
Island	Japanese name	Russian name	Ainu transcription(s)	Area km^{2}	Highest point m	Latitude N	Longitude E	Distance from Cape Nosappu km
Shikotan	色丹島 しこたんとう; Shikotan tō	Остров Шикотан	si-kotan (Big village)	255	412.6	43°47'	146°44'	73.3
Spangberg channel (Habomai islands are shown below.); Shikotan channel
Oskolki	海馬島 かいばじま、とどじま; Kaibajima, Todojima	Остров Осколки	todo-mosir (Steller sea lion island)	1.5	38	43°34'	146°24'	
Polonskogo	多楽島 たらくとう; Taraku tō	Остров Полонского	torar-uk (Take in the strap)	11.69	25	43°37'	146°19'	45.5
Chayka rock	カブ島 かぶとう; Kabu tō	Скала Чайка						
Petsernaya	カナクソ岩 かなくそいわ; Kanakuso iwa	Скала Пещерная						
Shishki	カブト島 かぶととう; Kabuto tō	Острова Шишки						
Polonskogo channel Taraku channel
Zelyony	志発島 しぼつとう; Shibotsu tō	Остров Зелёный	sipe-op (A place where a shoal of Chum salmon)	58.3	45	43°29'	146°09'	25.5
Vojeikov channel Shibotsu channel
Demina	春苅島 はるかるとう; Harukaru tō	Острова Дёмина	haru-kar-kotan (Village of harvesting Cardiocrinum cordatum bulbs)	2	34	43°25'	146°10'	
Yuri	勇留島 ゆりとう; Yuri tō	Остров Юрий	urir (Cormorant island)	10		43°25'	146°04'	16.6
Yuri channel
Anuchina	秋勇留島 あきゆりとう; Akiyuri tō	Остров Анучина	aki-urir (Yuri's young brother)	5	33	43°21'	146°00'	13.7
Tanfilyeva	水晶島 すいしょうとう; Suishō tō	Остров Танфильева	si-so (Big bare rock)	21	15	43°26'	145°55'	7.2
Goyōmai channel Sovetskiy channel
Storozhevoy	萌茂尻島 もえもしりとう; Moemoshiri tō	Остров Сторожевой	moi-mosir (A calm island)	0.07	11.8	43°23'	145°53'	6.0
Rifovy	オドケ島 おどけとう; Odoke tō	Остров Рифовый		0.001	3.6	43°23'	145°52'	
Signalny	貝殻島 かいがらじま; Kaigarajima	Остров Сигнальный	kay-ka-ra-i (Low thing above the wave)			43°23'	145°51'	3.7
Cape Nosappu, Hokkaido

== See also ==
- Offshore islets of Shikotan
