= Broutona =

Uninhabited island in the Kuril Island chain

Native name: Броутона (Russian); 武魯頓島 (Japanese)
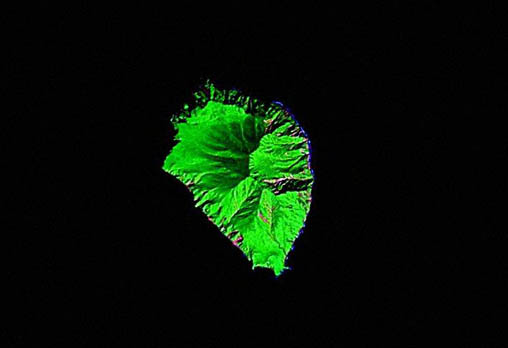
- Landsat Image of Broutona

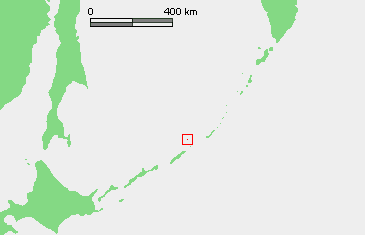

Geography
- Location: Sea of Okhotsk
- Coordinates: 46.72°N 150.73°E
- Archipelago: Kuril Islands
- Area: 7 km^{2} (2.7 sq mi)
- Highest elevation: 801 m (2628 ft)

Administration
- Russia

Demographics
- Population: 0

Broutona (Russian: остров Броутона; Japanese: 武魯頓島, romanized: Buroton-tō) is an uninhabited volcanic island located near the northern end of the southern Kuril Islands chain in the Sea of Okhotsk in the northwest Pacific Ocean. Its name is derived from William Robert Broughton, a British ship captain who charted many of the Kuril Islands during his voyages during the 18th century. Its original Ainu name was Makanrur, which translates roughly to "island in a strong current".

== Geology ==
Broutona is roughly circular, with an area of 7 square kilometres (3 square miles). It is located approximately 17 kilometres (11 miles) to the northwest of the twin islands of Chirpoy and Brat Chirpoyev.

The island consists of a dormant or extinct stratovolcano, which rises to 801 metres (2,628 feet) above sea level. The mountain has not erupted in historic times. The island has steep cliff sides, which can reach heights of 274 m (899 ft) and no sandy beaches, making landing very difficult and dangerous even in calm weather. These cliffs are weak and are easily eroded by the sea.

== History ==
Broutona appears to have never been inhabited. It appears on an official map showing the territories of Matsumae Domain, a feudal domain of Edo period Japan dated 1644, and these holdings were officially confirmed by the Tokugawa shogunate in 1715. Subsequently, claimed by the Empire of Russia, sovereignty initially passed to Russia under the terms of the Treaty of Shimoda, but was returned to the Empire of Japan per the Treaty of Saint Petersburg along with the rest of the Kuril islands. The island was formerly administered as part of Uruppu District of Nemuro Subprefecture of Hokkaidō. After World War II, the island came under the control of the Soviet Union, and is now administered as part of the Sakhalin Oblast of the Russian Federation.

== Fauna ==
In the spring and summer northern fulmar and fork-tailed storm petrel nest on the island.

== See also ==
- List of volcanoes in Russia
