= Offshore islets of Shikotan =

The Offshore islets of Shikotan include several tiny islets and rocks scattered around the coast of Shikotan island, which in turn is a part of Lesser Kuril Chain in Sakhalin Oblast of Russia. The islets are claimed by Japan together with Shikotan as parts of the nominal Shikotan District (色丹郡, Shikotan-gun).

Name	Area, km^{2}	Maximum height, m	Coordinates	Image
Griega island	1.26	c. 70	43°45′11″N 146°47′56″E	
Aivazovskogo island	0.79	58.8	43°43′40″N 146°41′41″E	
Devyatyy Val	-	-	43°44′03″N 146°42′46″E	
Gnechko	0.0307	30	43°48′31″N 146°52′05″E	
Dalniy island	-	62	43°47′26″N 146°51′03″E	
Sredniy island	-	42	43°48′01″N 146°50′28″E	
Farkhutdinova island	0.0307	-	43°48′28″N 146°53′10″E	
Kapitsy island	0.286	30	43°49′06″N 146°54′42″E	

== History ==
In 1855 the islets together with Shikotan were incorporated into Empire of Japan on conditions of Treaty of Shimoda.

After World War II the islets have become part of the USSR and then Russia. Though some of them used to have Japanese names, only the lesser part of them were named in Russian, while the major part remained unnamed during the Soviet era. In 2012 one of the islets was named after Sergey Kapitsa, a prominent Russian physicist who recently died in the same year. The Russian Geographical Society made an expedition to the area in 2012 to generate ideas for naming further five islets which were officially given Russian names in 2017. Two of them, Gnechko and Farkhutdinov, are part of Shikotan's islets.
