= Habomai, Hokkaido =

Dissolved municipality in Hanasaki district, Hokkaido, Japan

Habomai 歯舞村
- Village
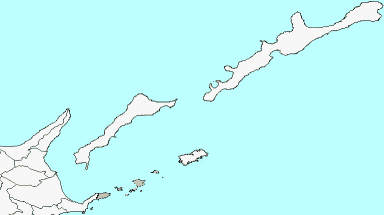
- Location of Habomai in Hokkaido (Nemuro Subprefecture)

- Location in Japan
- Coordinates: 43°20′N 145°45′E
- Country: Japan
- Region: Hokkaido
- Prefecture: Hokkaido (Nemuro Subprefecture)
- Now part of Nemuro: April 1, 1959

Area
  - Total: 65.0 km^{2} (25.1 sq mi)

Population (October 1, 1955)
  - Total: 5,205
- Time zone: UTC+09:00 (JST)
- City hall address: Habomai-mura, Hanasaki-gun, Hokkaido

Habomai (歯舞村, Habomai-mura) was a village formerly located in Hokkaido, Japan.

It controlled the Habomai Islands and the eastern part of the Nemuro Peninsula.

After World War II, the Habomai Islands were occupied by the Soviet Union. Habomai village was dissolved in 1959 and merged into Nemuro, including the Habomai islands.
