= Shikotan =

Disputed island in the Kuril Island chain

Disputed island Native name: Шикотан (Russian); 色丹島 (Japanese); シコタン (Ainu)
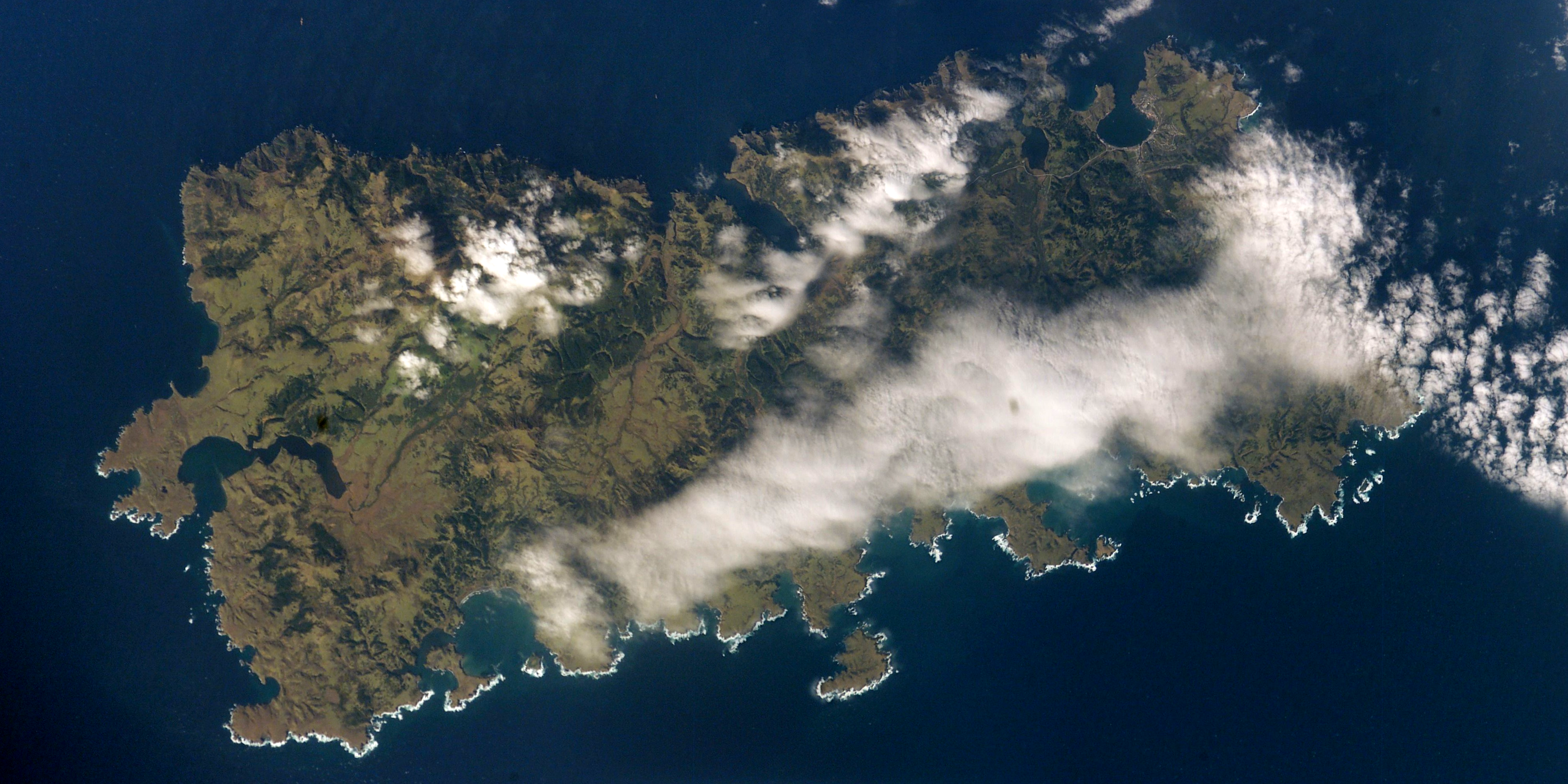
- NASA picture of Shikotan Island

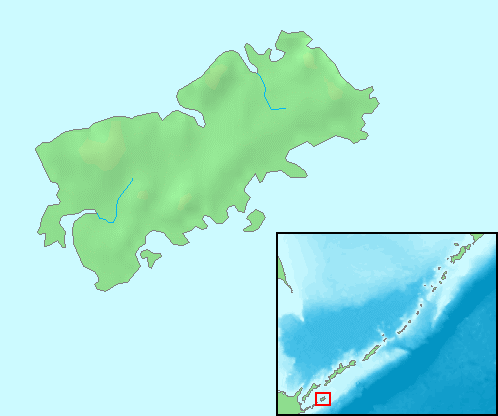
- Other names: Shpanberg, Spanberg

Geography
- Location: Pacific Ocean
- Coordinates: 43°48′N 146°45′E
- Archipelago: Kuril Islands
- Total islands: 1
- Area: 225 km^{2} (87 sq mi)
- Highest elevation: 412 m (1352 ft)
- Highest point: Mount Shakotan

Administration
- Russia
- Federal subject: Sakhalin Oblast
- District: Yuzhno-Kurilsky

Claimed by
- Japan
- Prefecture: Hokkaido
- Subprefecture: Nemuro

Demographics
- Population: 3,800 (2021)

Shikotan, (Note: Russian: Шикотан, romanized: Shikotan; Japanese: 色丹島, romanized: Shikotan-tō; from Ainu: シコタン, romanized: si-kotan, lit. 'large village') also known as Shpanberg or Spanberg, (Note: Russian: Шпанберг, romanized: Shpanberg) is an island in the Kurils administered by the Russian Federation as part of Yuzhno-Kurilsky District of Sakhalin Oblast. It is claimed by Japan as the titular Shikotan District, (Note: Japanese: 色丹郡, romanized: Shikotan-gun) organized as part of Nemuro Subprefecture of Hokkaido Prefecture. The island's primary economic activities are fisheries and fishing, with the principal marine products being cod, crab, and kelp. The 2021 Russian census recorded a population of 3,800 people.

== Names ==
The English name Shikotan transcribes both the Japanese name 色丹 and the Russian name Шикотан. The Japanese name derives from the Ainu si-kotan (シコタン), which means "large village". The name combines the Ainu reflexive or embellishing prefix si- and the word kotan ("settlement, village"), used metonymically in Ainu for each of the islands of the Kurils.

The alternative Russian name Shpanberg (Шпанберг), sometimes anglicized as Spanberg, honors Martin Spanberg, one of Vitus Bering's lieutenants who led three voyages in 1738, 1739, and 1742 that first initiated Russian diplomatic relations with Japan and helped accelerate Russian control of the Kurils.

== Geography ==
The total land area of Shikotan is 225 square kilometers (87 sq mi). The island is hilly, averaging 300 metres (984 ft) in elevation. The highest elevation is 412 metres (1,352 ft). The shores of the island are very indented and covered with oceanic meadows. The island is formed by the volcanic rock and sandstone of the Upper Cretaceous and Cenozoic periods. There are two extinct volcanoes on Shikotan: Mount Tomari and Mount Notoro. A number of tiny islets and rocks are scattered around the coast of Shikotan. Two larger islands lie off the south coast: Griega island; and Aivazovskogo island which lies in a bay near the western end of the southern coast.

Shikotan's vegetation consists mostly of Sakhalin fir, larch, deciduous trees, bamboo underbrush, and juniper brushwood.

There are two villages: Malokurilskoye, formerly Shikotan (色丹); and Krabozavodskoye, formerly Anama (穴澗)

== History ==
Russia recognised Japanese sovereignty over the island in the 19th century under Shimoda Treaty. In 1885, Hanasaki District, to which the island belongs, was split off of Nemuro Province and incorporated into Chishima Province.

On 1 September 1945, during the final days of World War II, the island, which had a population of 1,038 at the time, was invaded by 600 Soviet troops during the Soviet invasion of the Kuril Islands. It is one of the islands (along with the Habomai Islands) which the Soviet Union agreed in 1956 to transfer to Japan in the event of a peace treaty between the two countries, but such a peace treaty has never been concluded. During the late 1950s and the 1960s, the Soviet Union fortified the island against a possible seaborne invasion by repurposing old tanks (mainly IS-2 and IS-3 heavy tanks) as coastal artillery, digging them into the ground to serve as fixed gun emplacements.

On 6 November 1958, a magnitude 8.3 to 8.4 earthquake in the Pacific Ocean off Iturup in the Kuril Islands generated a tsunami with a height of up to 5 metres (16.4 ft) at Shikotan. A magnitude 8.3 earthquake in the Pacific Ocean just off Shikotan and subsequent tsunami on 4 October 1994 caused major damage on the island's coastline. The tsunami had a run-up height of as much as 10 metres (33 ft) on Shikotan.

== In popular culture ==
The 2014 anime film Giovanni's Island is a fictionalized account of the fate of Japanese civilians living on Shikotan at the time of the 1945 Soviet occupation.

== Gallery ==
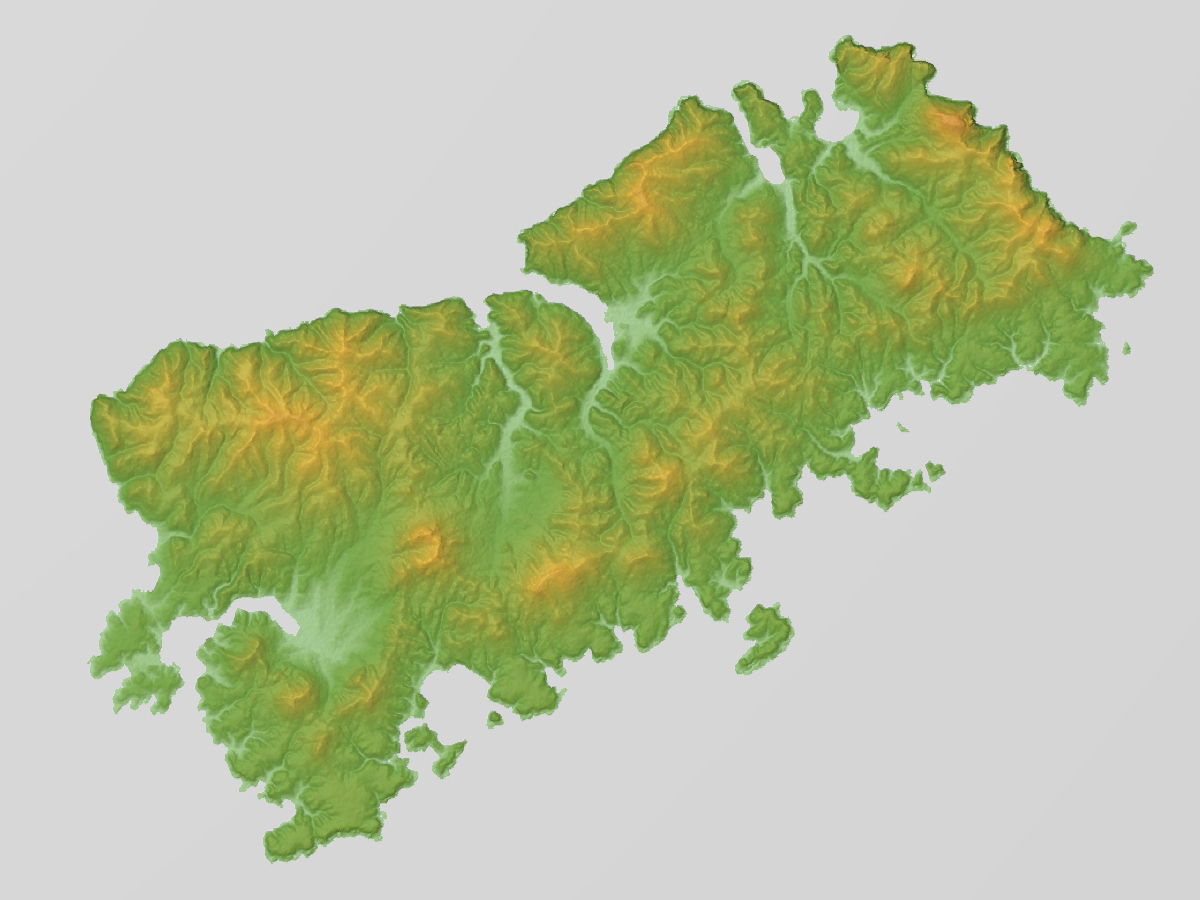
Relief map

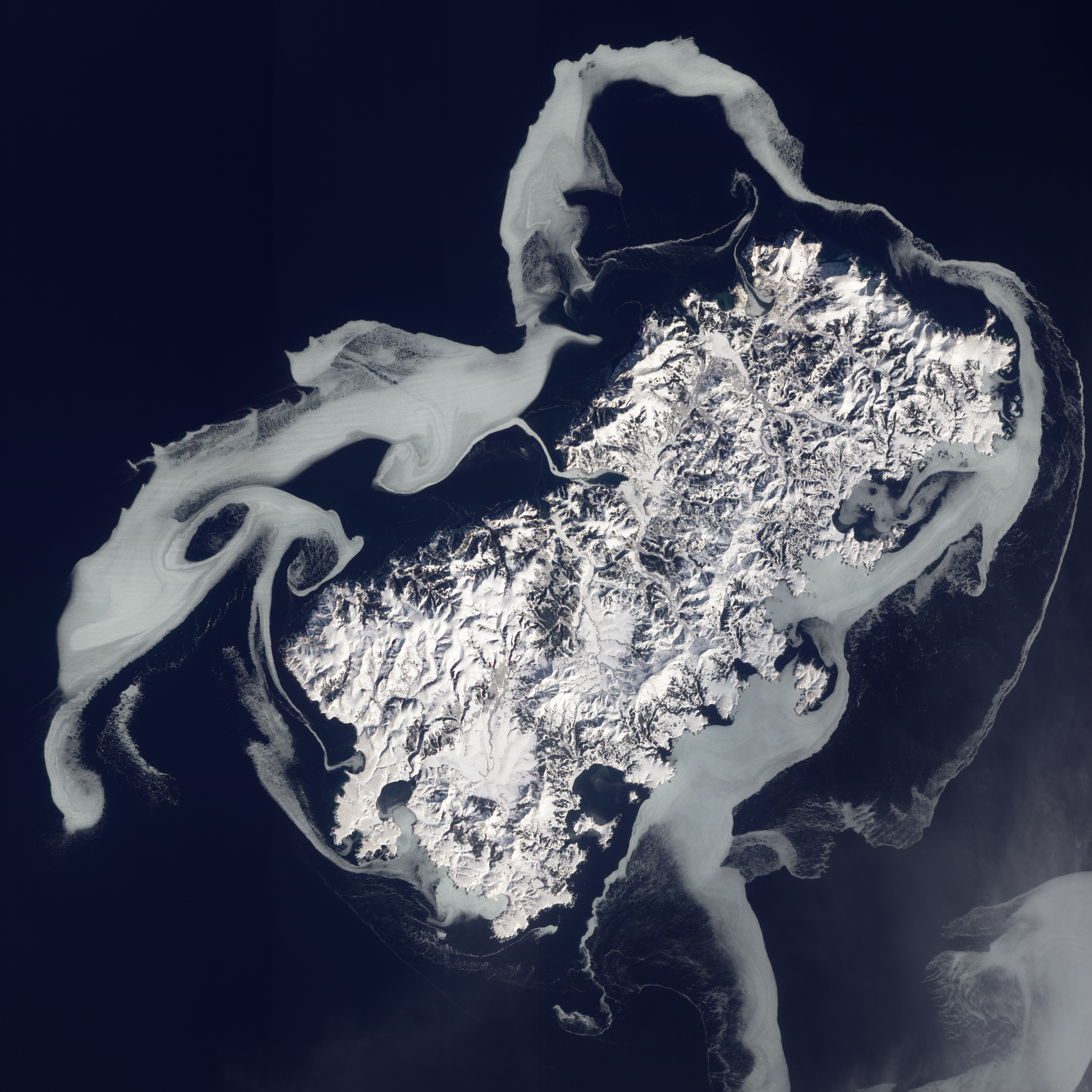
Sea ice surrounding Shikotan, 2011

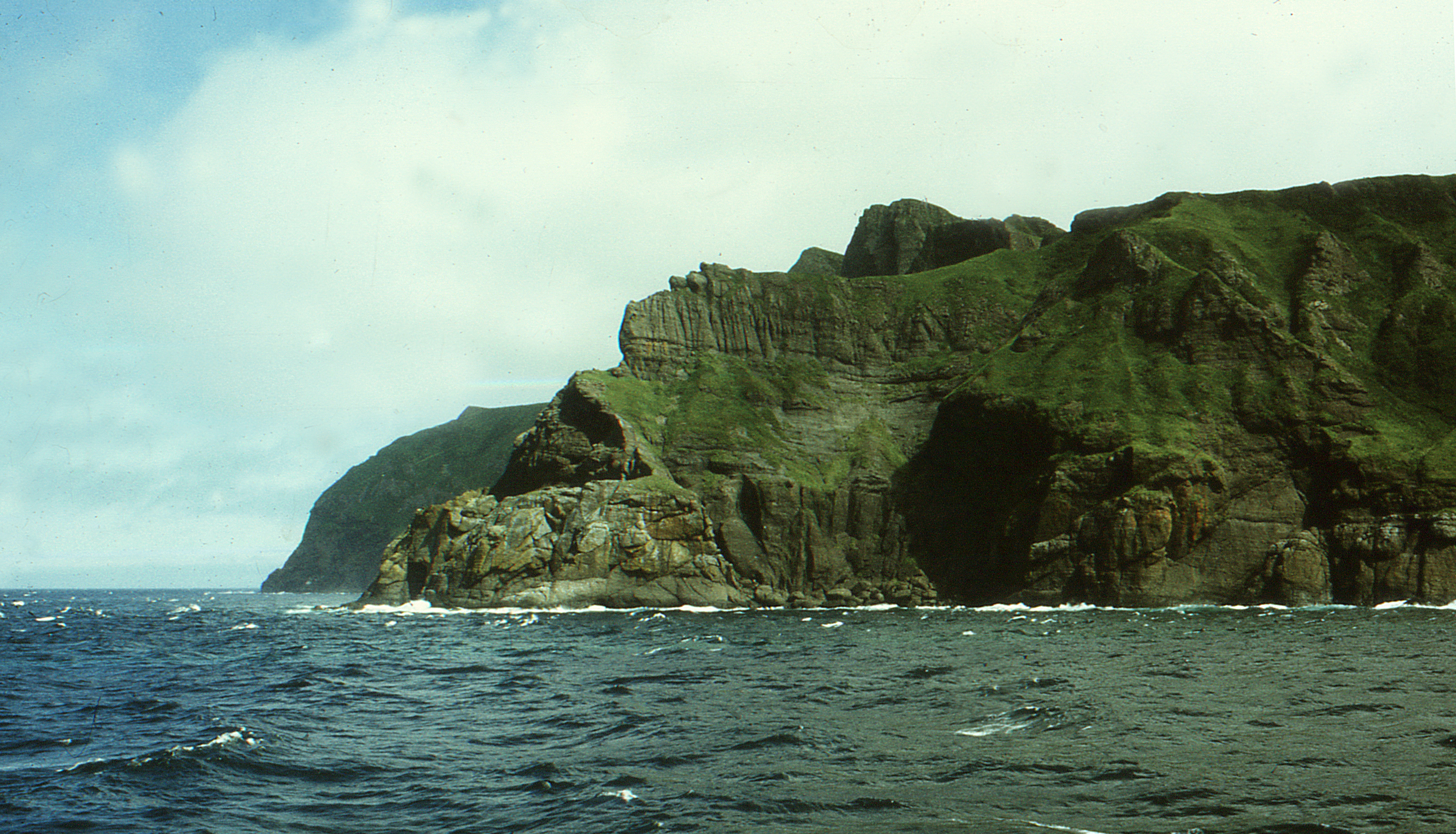
Shikotan Island, 1990

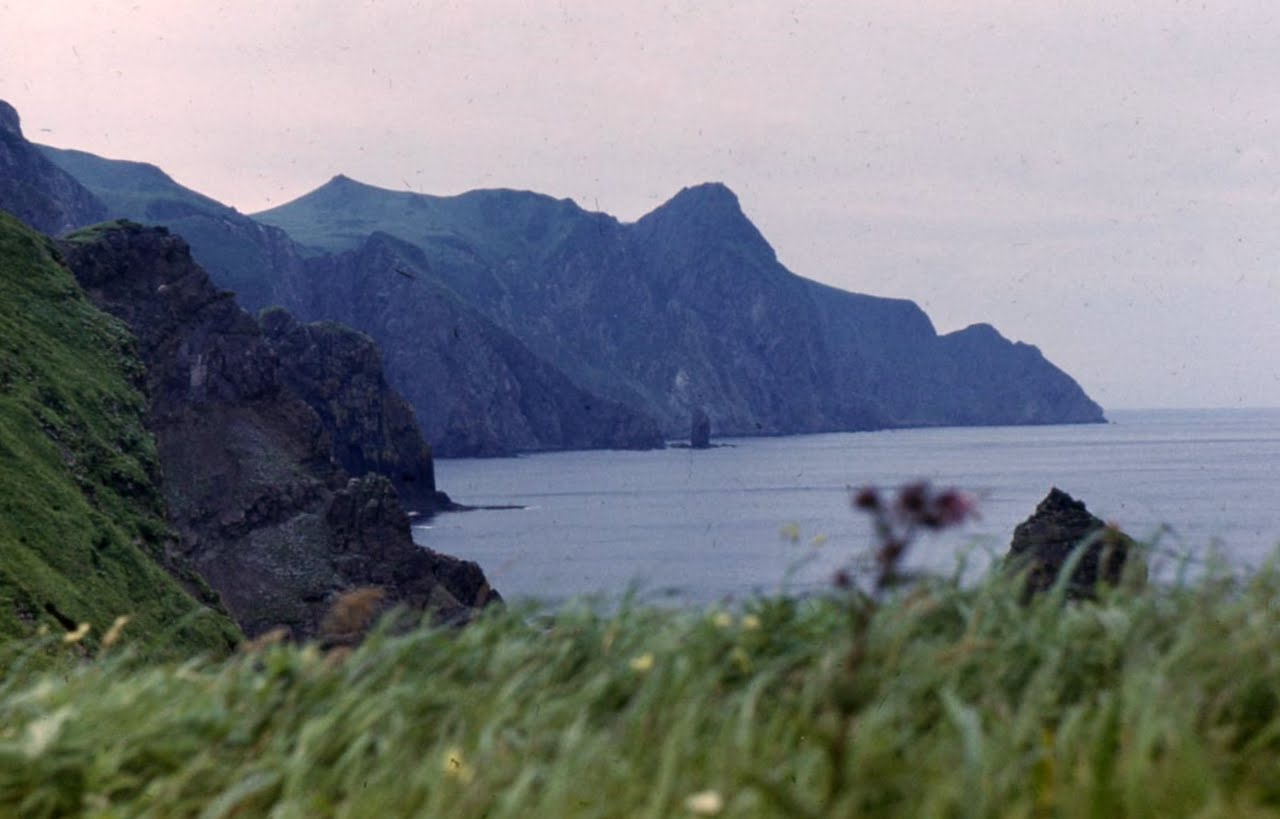
Shikotan, 1980

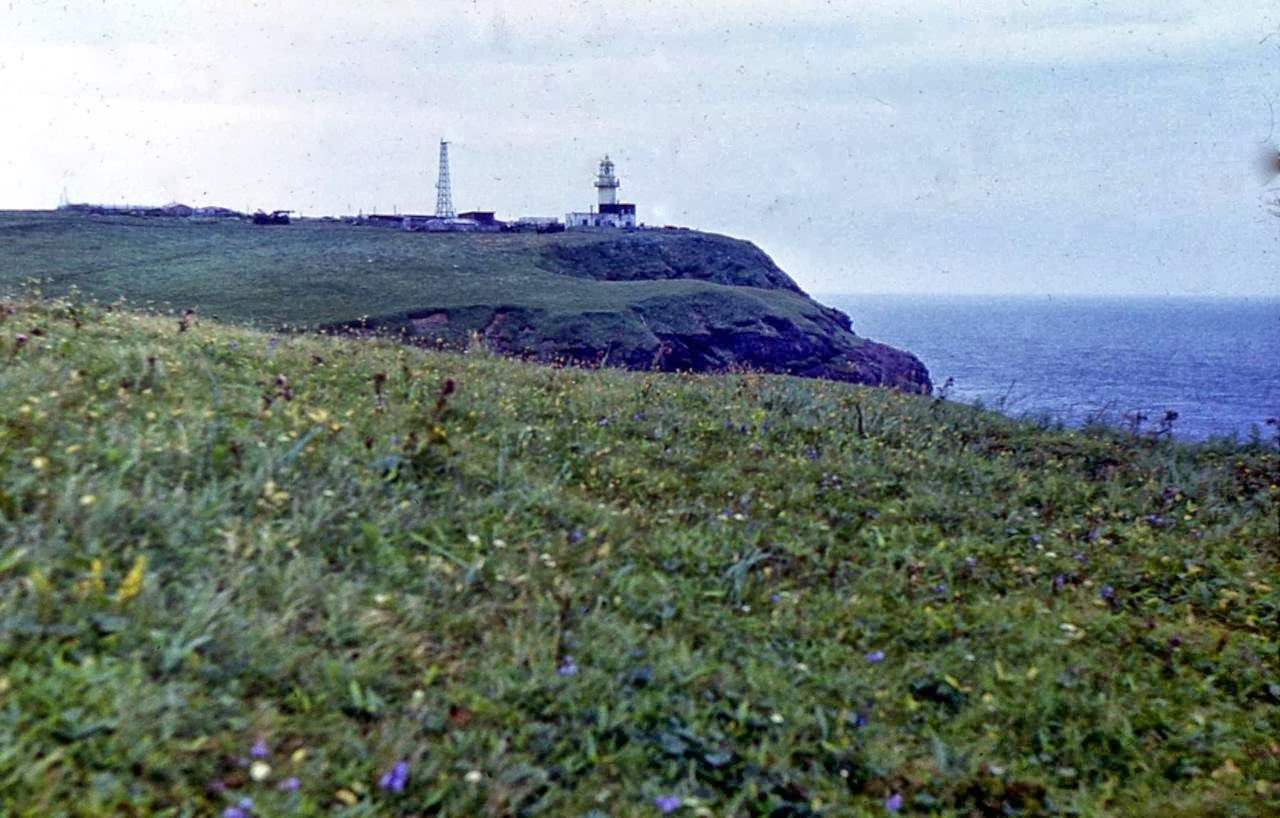
Lighthouse, 1980

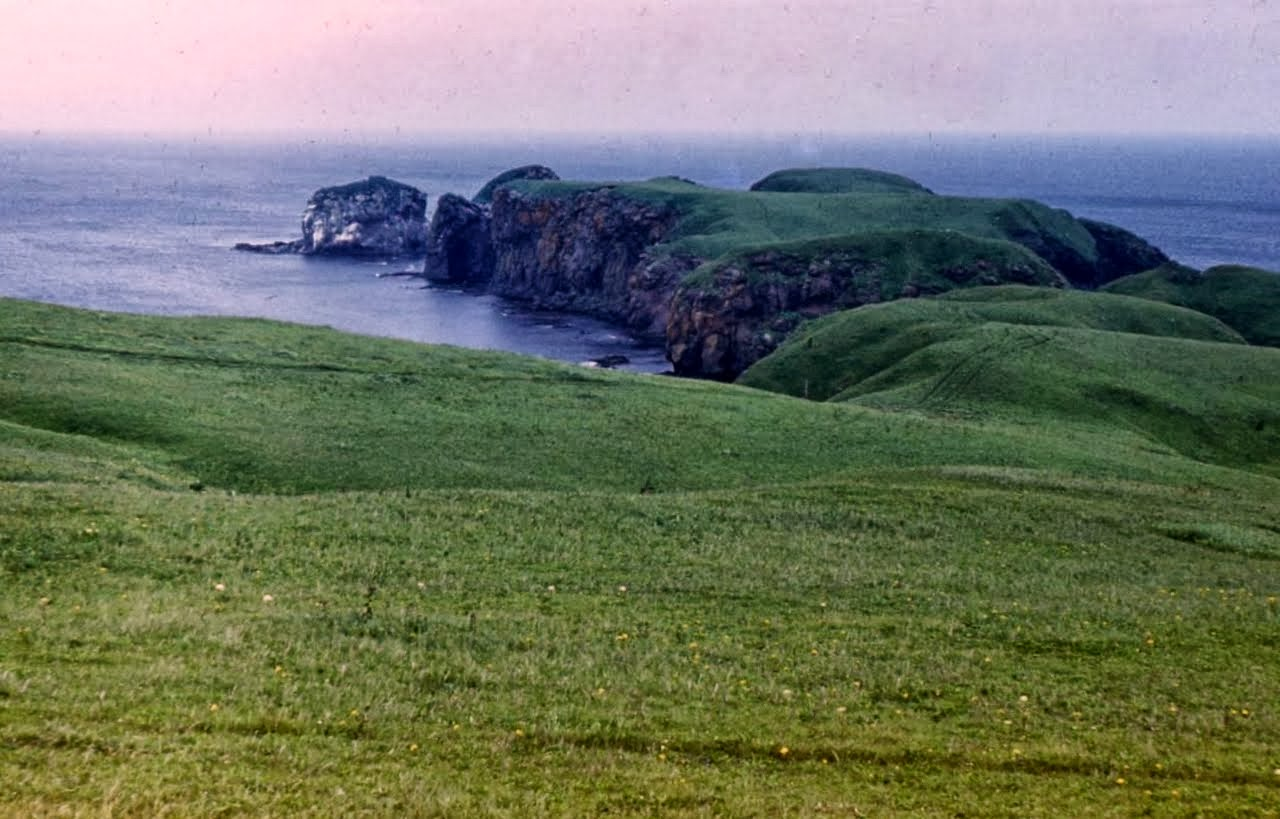
Landscape, 1980

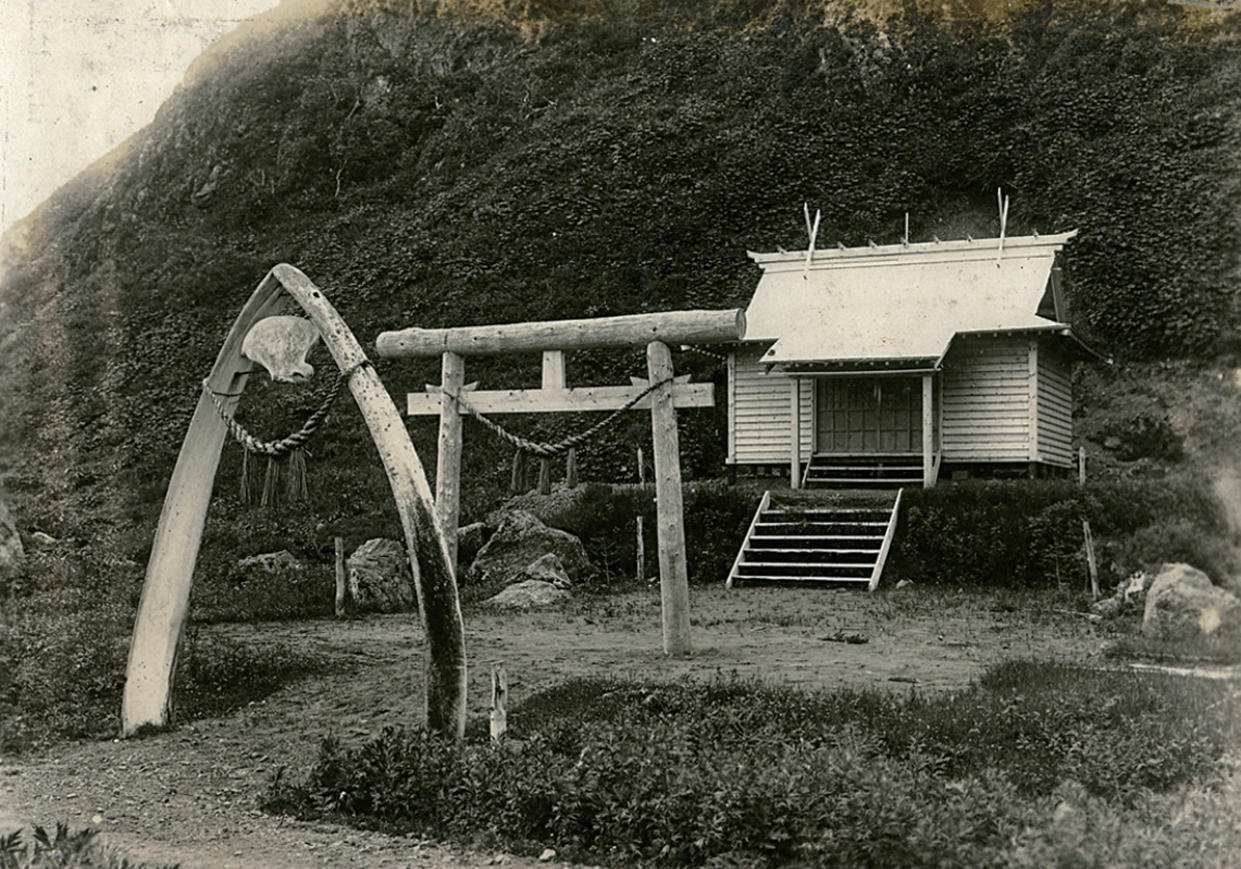
Pre–World War II Shinto shrine with a torii made of whale bones

== See also ==
- Kuril Islands dispute
- Soviet–Japanese Joint Declaration of 1956
