= Chyornye Bratya =

Islands in the Kuril Island chain

Native name: Чёрные Братья (Russian); 知理保以島 (Japanese)
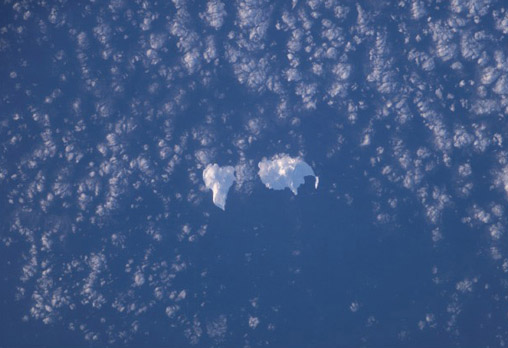
- NASA picture of Chirpoy & Brat Chirpoyev

- Location within Sakhalin Oblast
- Interactive map of Chyornye Bratya

Geography
- Location: Sea of Okhotsk
- Coordinates: 46°30′N 150°51′E
- Archipelago: Kuril Islands
- Area: 36 km^{2} (14 sq mi)
- Highest elevation: 691 m (2267 ft)

Administration
- Russia

Demographics
- Population: 0

Chyornye Bratya (Russian: Чёрные Братья, lit. 'Black Brothers'; Japanese: 知理保以島, romanized: Chiripoi-to) is a pair of uninhabited volcanic islands between Simushir and Urup in the Kuril Islands chain in the Sea of Okhotsk in the northwest Pacific Ocean. The larger (northern) of the two is Chirpoy, and the smaller (southern) is Brat Chirpoyev (Russian for Chirpoy's Brother). The origin of the names is uncertain: the original Ainu language name of the island was Repunmosir, a word meaning “place of many small birds”.

== Geography ==
The Chirpoy islands are the remains of a partially submerged volcanic caldera which measures 8–9 km wide. The two islands are surrounded by a number of small islets and offshore rocks and together, the collective forms the Chyornye Bratya Islands. Both islands are separated by a strait, known in Russian as the 'Snow Strait' (Russian: пролив Сноу, romanized: proliv Snou) after British explorer Henry James Snow.

Chirpoy, the northernmost of the two islands, has an area of approximately 21 km^{2}, and consists of three overlapping stratovolcanoes named Chyorny and Snow. Chyorny (Japanese: 大崩山, romanized: Okuzureyama), with a height of 691 metres (2,267 ft) is the tallest point on the island. On November 27, 2012, Snow erupted on this island, and is continuing as of January 2, 2013.

Brat Chirpoyev, the southern of the two islands, has an area of approximately 16 km^{2}. However, the tallest structure out of both islands is on Brat Chirpoy where 749 metres (2,457 ft) tall Brat Chirpoyev dominates the island. Brat Chirpoy is the site of the southernmost of five major Steller sea lion rookeries on the Kuril Islands.

== History ==
Chirpoy appears on an official map showing the territories of Matsumae Domain, a feudal domain of Edo period Japan dated 1644, and these holdings were officially confirmed by the Tokugawa shogunate in 1715. Administration of the islands came under the Matsumae domain's regional office location on Kunashir from 1756. In 1801, the Japanese government officially claimed control of the islands, incorporating them into Ezo Province (now Hokkaidō), but sovereignty passed to the Empire of Russia under the terms of the Treaty of Shimoda in 1855. Under the Treaty of Saint Petersburg (1875), sovereignty passed to the Empire of Japan along with the rest of the Kuril islands. The islands were formerly administered as part of Uruppu District of Nemuro Subprefecture of Hokkaidō.

In 1952, upon signing the Treaty of San Francisco, Japan renounced its claim to the islands. The islands are uninhabited and are administered as part of the Sakhalin Oblast of the Russian Federation.

== See also ==
- Desert island
- List of islands
