= Zelyony Island (Kuril Islands) =

Island in the Kurile island Chain

Zelyony
Native name: Зелёный
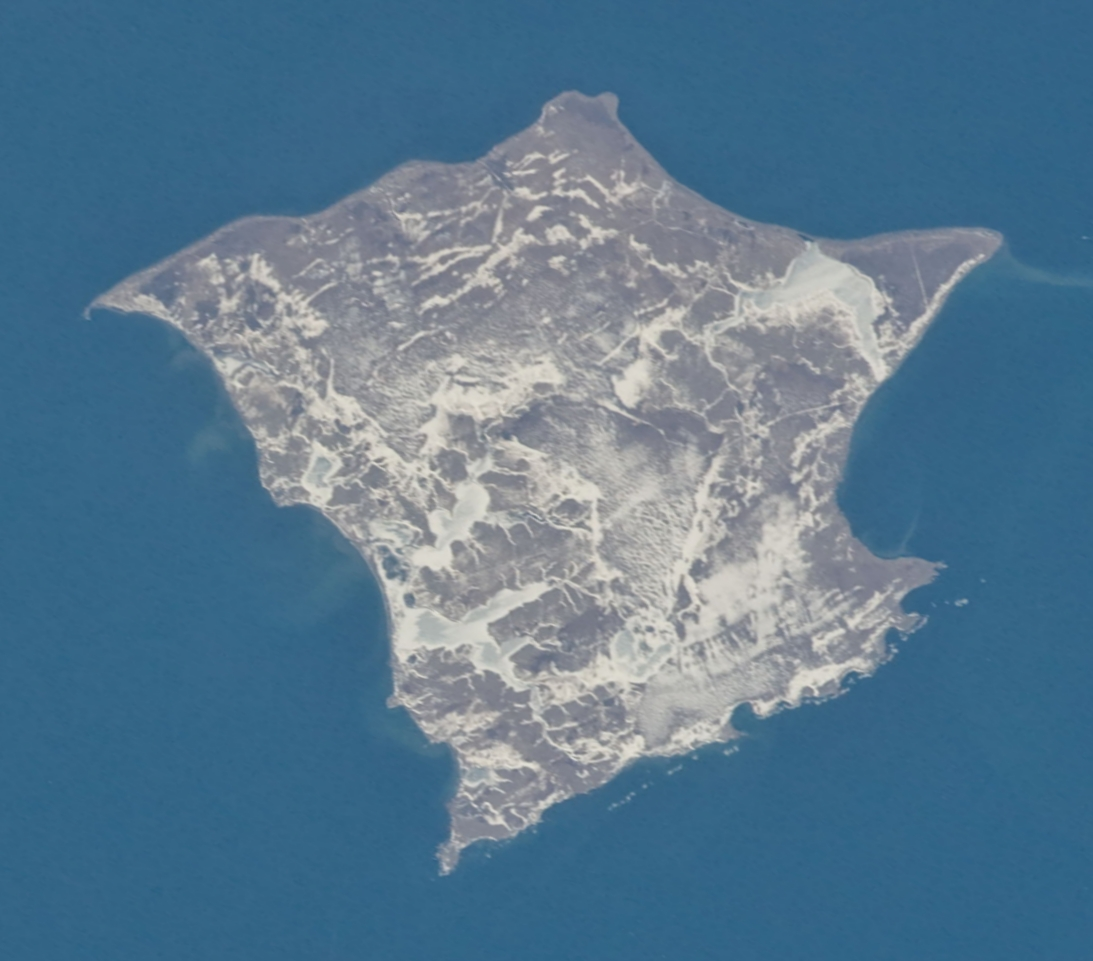
- Zelyony, photographed from the ISS
- Interactive map of Zelyony

Geography
- Location: Pacific Ocean
- Coordinates: 43°30′N 146°08′E
- Area: 58.38 km^{2} (22.54 sq mi)

Administration
- Russia

Demographics
- Population: 0

Zelyony (Russian: Остров Зелёный, romanized: Ostrov Zelyony, lit. 'green island', Russian pronunciation: [ˈostrəf zʲɪˈlʲɵnɨj]; Japanese: 志発島, romanized: Shibotsu-tō, Japanese pronunciation: [ɕi̥botsɯ̥toː]) is an unpopulated and uninhabited island in the Kuril Island chain, Sakhalin Oblast, Russia. Although it is administered by Russia and had been previously by the Soviet Union, it has been claimed by Japan since 1945.

== History ==
Zelyony was first mapped in 1739 by the Danish-Russian explorer Martin Spanberg. The island was known to the Japanese as Shibotsu-tō, but never settled, and Russia claimed jurisdiction over it. In 1855, jurisdiction was transferred to Japan, and the island was settled. In 1945, its population was 2,149. At the end of World War II, the Japanese military garrison surrendered to Soviet troops, the island was incorporated into the Soviet Union, and the Japanese population was repatriated to Japan. Although it has been officially uninhabited since, it was garrisoned from 1945 onward by the Soviet military.

Zelyony was the site of an incident between the United States and the Soviet Union in April 1983. As part of the US-South Korean joint military exercise Team Spirit, six U.S. navy Corsair II attack aircraft flew over the island. The Soviet Union protested the incursion and a Soviet retaliatory flight over the Aleutian Islands was considered. Due to the Kuril Islands' disputed status, an American apology would have tacitly approved of the Soviet Union's presence and hurt Japan's claim to the island. As a result, the incident raised tensions between the USA and the USSR.
