= Yuzhno-Kurilsky District =

Yuzhno-Kurilsky District Южно-Курильский район (Russian)
- District
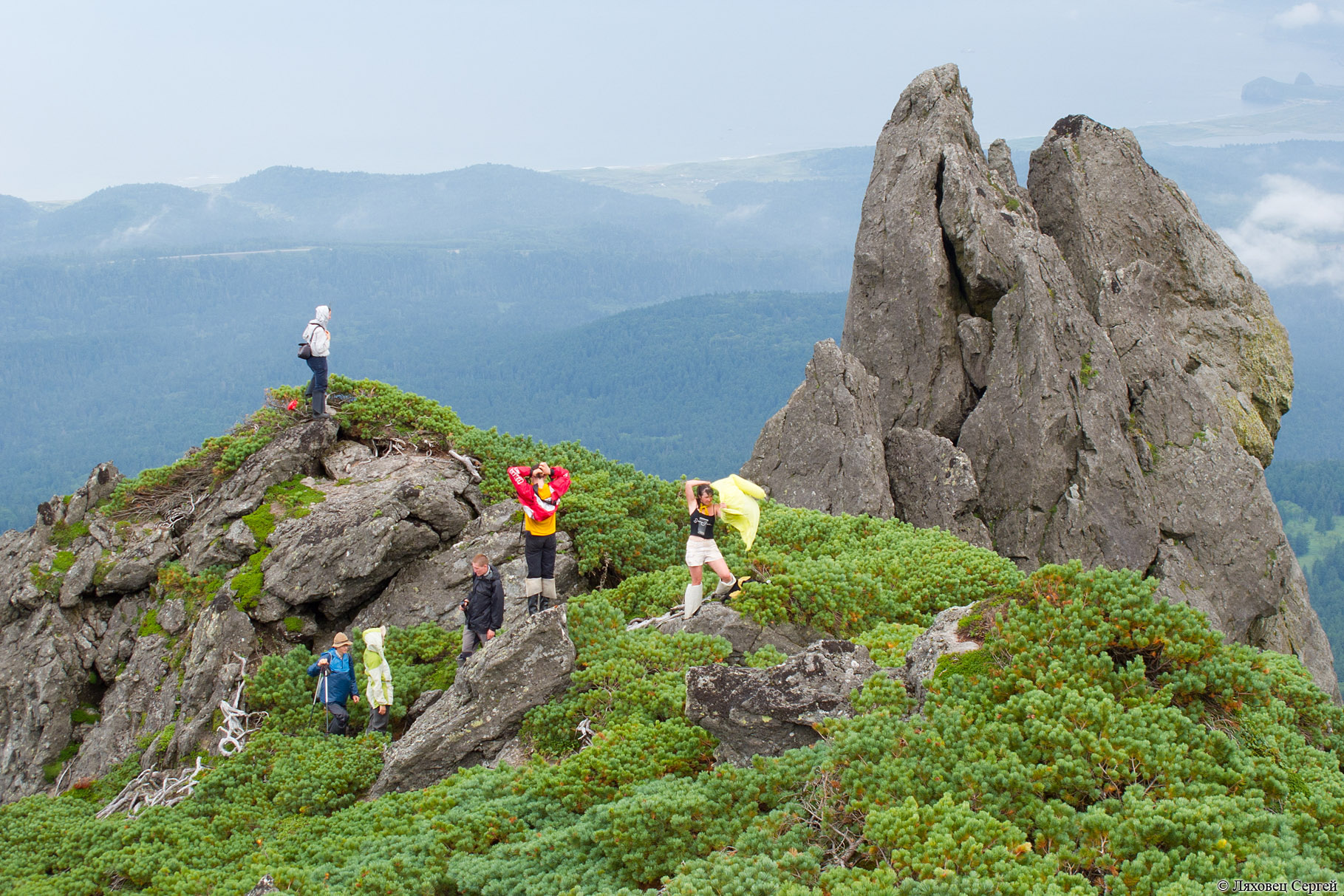
- On top of Mendeleeva volcano on Kunashir

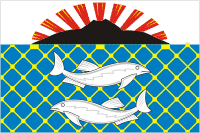
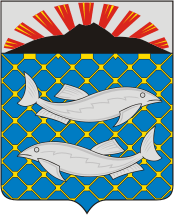
- Flag Coat of arms

- Location of Yuzhno-Kurilsky District in Sakhalin Oblast
- Coordinates: 44°01′50″N 145°51′20″E
- Country: Russia
- Federal subject: Sakhalin Oblast
- Established: 5 June 1946
- Administrative center: Yuzhno-Kurilsk

Area
  - Total: 1,856.1 km^{2} (716.6 sq mi)

Population (2010 Census)
  - Total: 9,501
  - Density: 5.119/km^{2} (13.26/sq mi)
  - Urban: 61.4%
  - Rural: 38.6%

Administrative structure
  - Inhabited localities: 9 rural localities

Municipal structure
  - Municipally incorporated as: Yuzhno-Kurilsky Urban Okrug
- Time zone: UTC+11 (MSK+8)
- OKTMO ID: 64756000
- Website: www.yuzhnokurilsk.ru

Yuzhno-Kurilsky District (Russian: Ю́жно-Кури́льский райо́н, lit. 'South Kuril District') is a district (raion) of Sakhalin Oblast, Russia, one of the seventeen in the oblast. Municipally, it is incorporated as Yuzhno-Kurilsky Urban Okrug. Its administrative centre and largest settlement is Yuzhno-Kurilsk, where a majority of its population resides. The district had 9,501 residents as of the 2010 Russian census.

The district consists of three of the Kuril Islands (from largest to smallest): Kunashir, Shikotan, and Habomai. Japan claims the entirety of the district as part of its wider claim to the southernmost Kuril Islands, which includes Iturup to the north.

== Administration and geography ==
Yuzhno-Kurilsky District one of the seventeen districts (raions) of Sakhalin Oblast in the Russian Far East. At the municipal level of government, the district is considered an urban okrug. The administrative centre is the urban locality (an urban-type settlement) of Yuzhno-Kurilsk.

The district consists of the islands (from largest to smallest) of Kunashir, Shikotan, and Habomai. The three islands, as well as Iturup to the north, are collectively known as the "Southern Kurils" in Russia and are claimed by Japan as its "Northern Territories" in what is known as the Kuril Islands dispute. Soviet troops occupied the Kuril Islands after the Allies' victory over Japan in World War II, but Japan maintains it never relinquished the Southern Kurils and considers the islands under Yuzhno-Kurilsky District to be part of Nemuro Subprefecture in Hokkaido. The Kuril Islands as a whole, and therefore the district, are considered by Russia to be part of its Far North region.

== Demographics ==
The following populations were recorded in the Russian censuses of the given years: 9,501 (2010 census); 9,727 (2002 census); 13,597 (1989 Soviet census). The largest settlement is Yuzhno-Kurilsk, which accounted for 61.4% of the district's total population in 2010.

== See also ==
- Kurilsky District
- Severo-Kurilsky District
