= Kuril Islands dispute =

Territorial dispute between Japan and Russia

Coordinates: 44°6′N 146°42′E

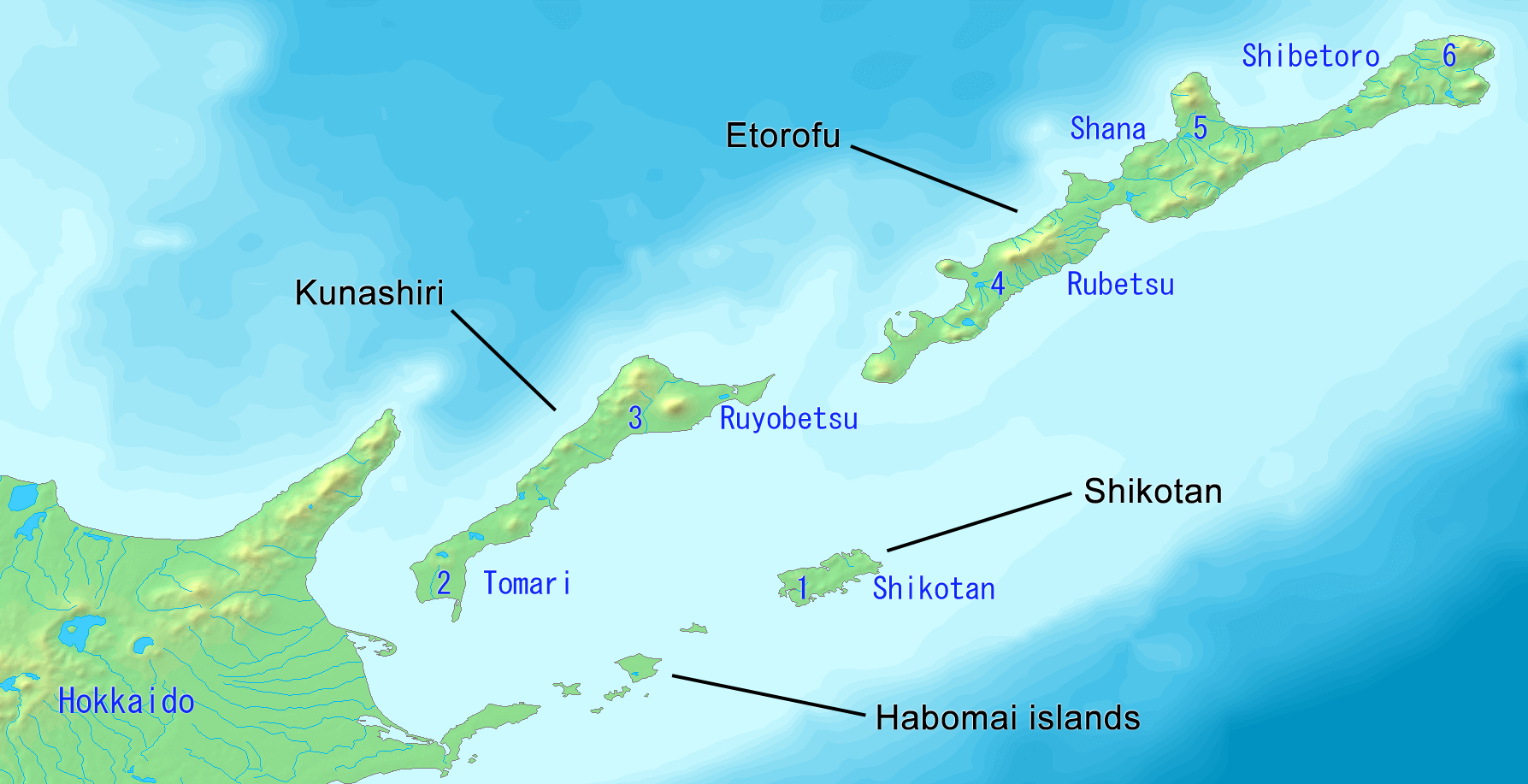
Map of the disputed islands: Iturup/Etorofu, Kunashir/Kunashiri, Shikotan, and the Habomai Islands

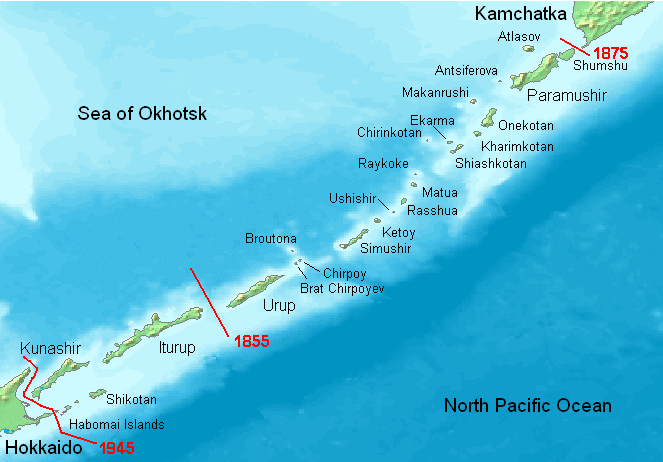
Map of the Kuril Islands with Russian names and the de facto border between Russia and Japan after the Treaty of Shimoda (1855), the Treaty of St. Petersburg (1875), and World War II (1945)

Russia and Japan have a territorial dispute over the four southernmost Kuril Islands, known in Russia as the Southern Kurils (Note: Russian: Южные Курилы, romanized: Yuzhnyye Kurily) and in Japan as the Northern Territories. (Note: Japanese: 北方領土, romanized: Hoppō Ryōdo) They are, from largest to smallest: Iturup/Etorofu, (Note: Russian: Итуру́п, romanized: Iturúp; Japanese: 択捉島, romanized: Etorofu-tō) Kunashir/Kunashiri, (Note: Russian: Кунаши́р, romanized: Kunashír; Japanese: 国後島, romanized: Kunashiri-tō) Shikotan, (Note: Russian: Шикотан, romanized: Shikotan; Japanese: 色丹島, romanized: Shikotan-tō) and the Habomai Islands. (Note: Russian: Острова Хабомаи, romanized: Ostrova Khabomai; Japanese: 歯舞群島, romanized: Habomai guntō) The Kuril Islands are a chain of islands that stretch between the Japanese island of Hokkaido at their southern end and the Russian Kamchatka Peninsula at their northern end. The islands separate the Sea of Okhotsk from the Pacific Ocean. The four disputed islands, like other islands in the Kuril chain which are not in dispute, were unilaterally annexed by the Soviet Union following the Invasion of the Kuril Islands at the end of World War II. The disputed islands are under Russian administration as the South Kuril District and part of the Kuril District of the Sakhalin Oblast (Сахалинская область, Sakhalinskaya oblast). They are claimed by Japan, which refers to them as its Northern Territories or Southern Chishima, and considers them part of the Nemuro Subprefecture of Hokkaido Prefecture.

The San Francisco Peace Treaty, (Note: Article 25 of this treaty defines the Allied Forces as "the States at war with Japan, [...] provided that in each case the State concerned has signed and ratified the Treaty. [...] the present Treaty shall not confer any rights, titles or benefits on any State which is not an Allied Power as herein defined; nor shall any right, title or interest of Japan be deemed to be diminished or prejudiced by any provision of the Treaty in favor of a State which is not an Allied Power as so defined." The Allied powers were Australia, Canada, Ceylon, France, Indonesia, the Kingdom of the Netherlands, New Zealand, Pakistan, the Republic of the Philippines, the United Kingdom of Great Britain and Northern Ireland, and the United States of America. The Soviet Union refused to sign the treaty.) signed between the Allies and Japan in 1951, states that Japan renounces "all right, title and claim to the Kuril Islands", but does not explicitly recognize the Soviet Union's sovereignty over them. Japan claims that at least some of the disputed islands are not a part of the Kuril Islands, and thus are not covered by the treaty. Russia maintains that the Soviet Union's sovereignty over the islands was recognized in post-war agreements. Japan and the Soviet Union ended their formal state of war with the Soviet–Japanese Joint Declaration of 1956 but did not sign a peace treaty. During talks leading to the joint declaration, the Soviet Union offered Japan the two smaller islands of Shikotan and the Habomai Islands in exchange for Japan renouncing all claims to the two larger islands of Iturup and Kunashir, but Japan declined the offer. This disagreement between the two-island offer made by the Soviet Union and Japan's demand of regaining two larger islands as well became the cornerstone for continuation of the dispute into the present day.

== Background ==
Political boundaries of the Pacific Rim in 1939. Dates shown indicate approximate time that the various powers gained control of their possessions.

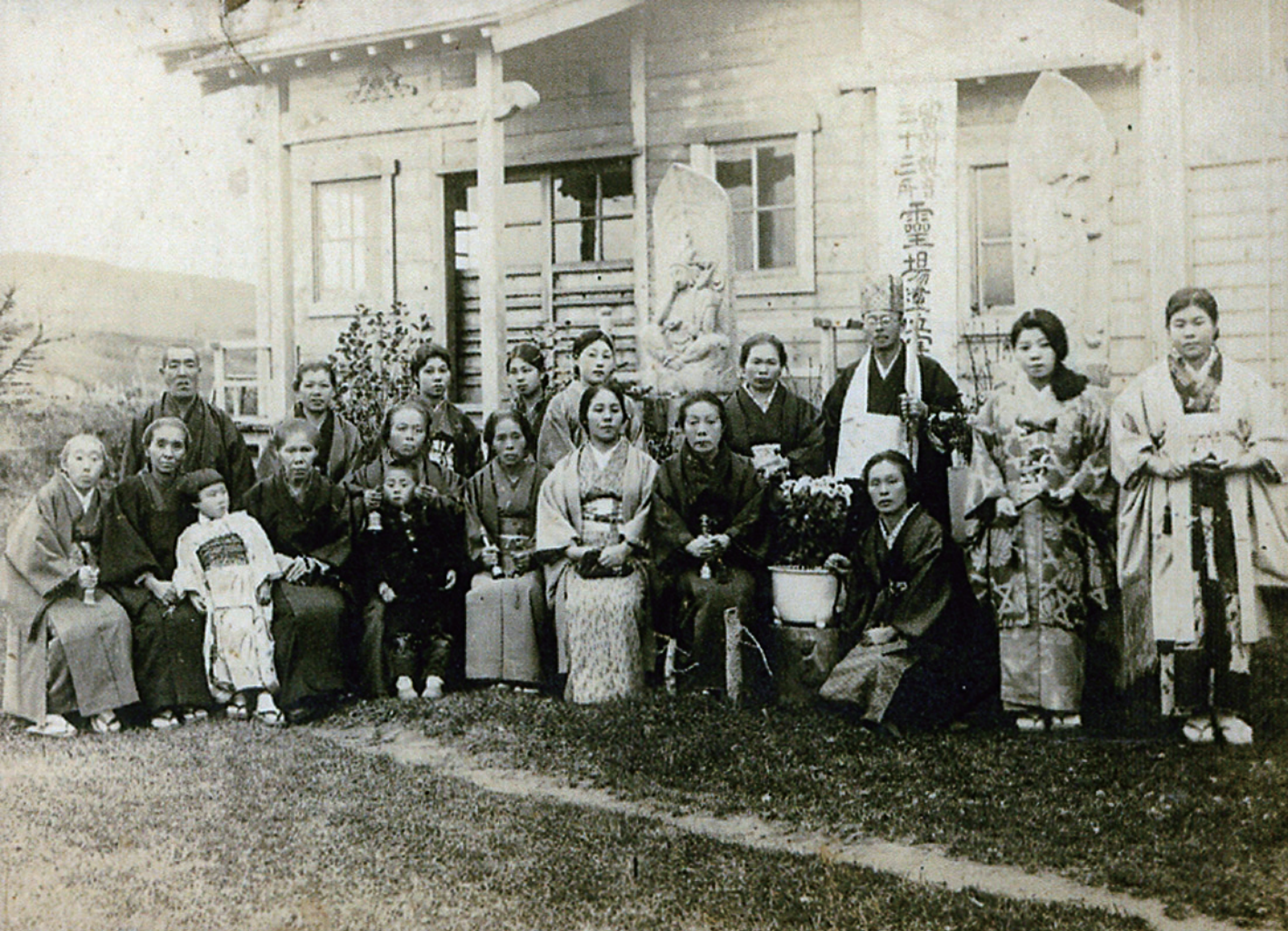
Japanese residents and a Buddhist temple in Etorofu (now Iturup), sometime before 1939

The first Russo-Japanese agreement to deal with the status of Sakhalin and the Kuril Islands was the 1855 Treaty of Shimoda, which first established official relations between the Russian Empire and Tokugawa Japan. Article 2 of the Treaty of Shimoda, which provided for an agreement on borders, states "Henceforth the borders between Russia and Japan will pass between the islands Iturup (Etorofu) and Urup (Uruppu). The whole island of Iturup belongs to Japan and the whole island Urup and the other Kuril Islands to the north constitute possessions of Russia". The islands of Kunashiri, Shikotan and the Habomai Islands, all lying to the south of Iturup, are not explicitly mentioned in the treaty and were understood at the time to be a non-disputed part of Japan. The treaty also specified that the island of Sakhalin/Karafuto was not to be partitioned but was to remain under a joint Russo-Japanese condominium.

In the 1875 Treaty of Saint Petersburg, Russia and Japan agreed that Japan would give up all rights to Sakhalin in exchange for Russia giving up all rights to the Kuril Islands in favor of Japan. However, a controversy remains as to what constitutes the Kuril Islands, due to translation discrepancies in the French official text of that treaty.

The Russo-Japanese War of 1904–05 was a military disaster for Russia. The 1905 Treaty of Portsmouth, concluded at the end of this war, gave the southern half of Sakhalin Island to Japan.

During the Russian Civil War following the October Revolution, Japan occupied parts of Russia's Far East initially as part of the Allied intervention, but did not formally annex any of these territories. Japanese forces withdrew from the Russian mainland in 1922 and from northern Sakhalin in 1925.

Japan was a main ally of Nazi Germany, which the Soviet Union initially had a non-aggression pact with, but found itself at war with from 22 June 1941. However, after the Battles of Khalkhin Gol ended the Japanese–Soviet Border War in 1939 and before the Soviet Union declared war on Japan on 8 August 1945, there was practically no hostile activity between the Soviet Union and the Empire of Japan. Between 1939 and 1945, millions of Soviet and Japanese soldiers were facing each other along the Manchurian border. The Soviet–Japanese Neutrality Pact was signed in Moscow on 13 April 1941, and became effective on 25 April, but was renounced by the Soviet Union on 5 April 1945. On 8 May Nazi Germany surrendered to the Allies, which ended the war in Europe and started the secret three-month countdown for the Russians to start hostilities against Japan, as per the Yalta Agreement. On 9 August 1945, just after midnight in Manchuria, the Soviets invaded Manchuria and the Soviet Union declared war on Japan, beginning the Soviet–Japanese War. The Soviet Union invaded South Sakhalin and the Kuril Islands in the subsequent days.

The Invasion of the Kuril Islands took place between 18 August and 3 September (Japan had announced its surrender 15 August, and formally signed it 2 September). The Japanese inhabitants of the Kurils were expelled two years later. The United States had helped the preparation of the Soviet invasion through Project Hula, transferring naval vessels to the Soviet Union.

== Modern dispute ==
=== World War II agreements ===
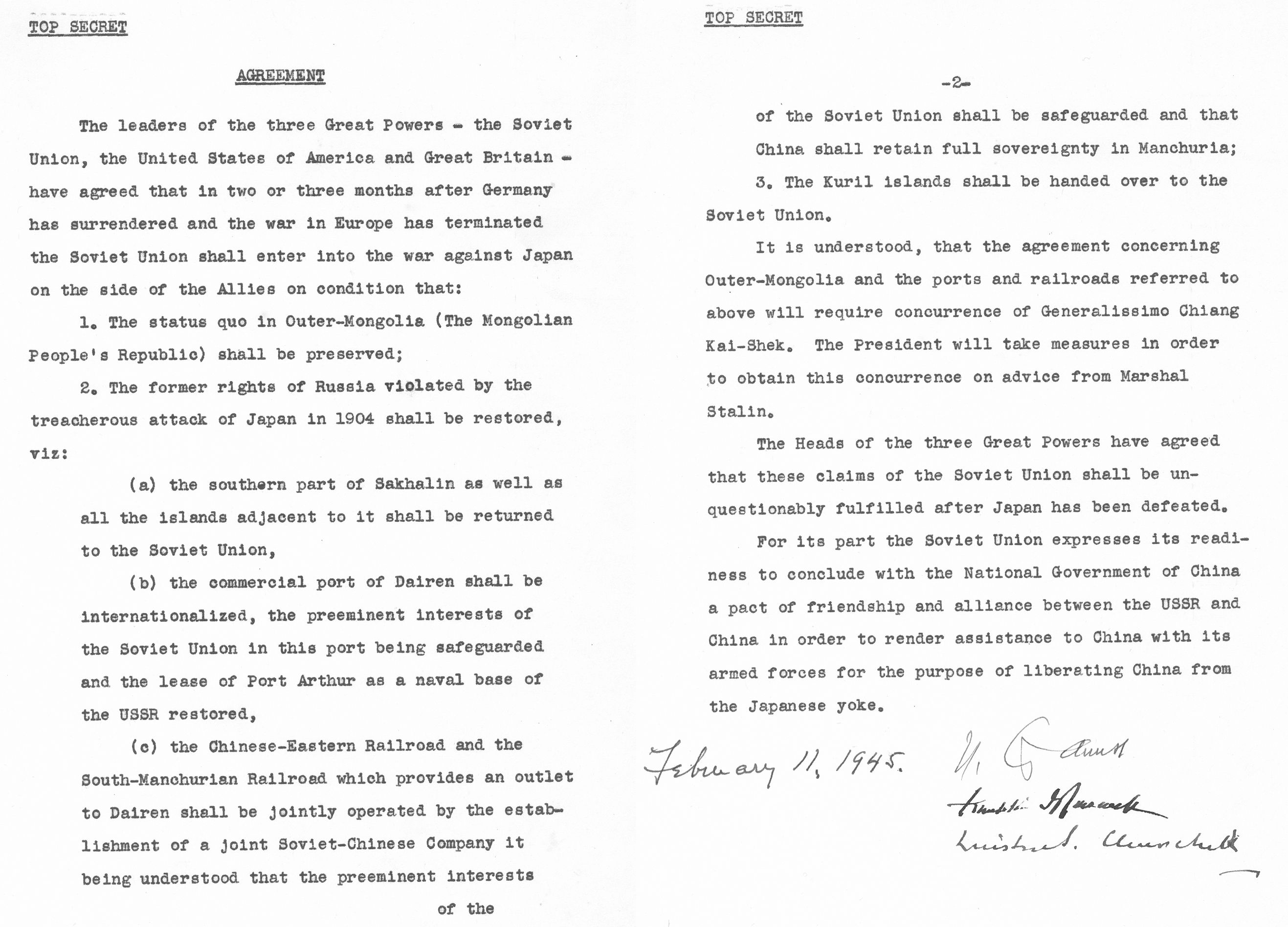
Agreement regarding entry of the Soviet Union into the war against Japan

The modern Kuril Islands dispute arose in the aftermath of World War II and results from the ambiguities in and disagreements about the meaning of the Yalta agreement (February 1945), the Potsdam Declaration (July 1945), and the Treaty of San Francisco (September 1951). The Yalta Agreement, signed by the US, Great Britain and the Soviet Union, stated:

The leaders of the three great powers – the Soviet Union, the United States of America and Great Britain – have agreed that in two or three months after Germany has surrendered and the war in Europe is terminated, the Soviet Union shall enter into war against Japan on the side of the Allies on condition that: ... 2. The former rights of Russia violated by the treacherous attack of Japan in 1904 shall be restored, viz.: (a) The southern part of Sakhalin as well as the islands adjacent to it shall be returned to the Soviet Union; ... 3. The Kuril islands shall be handed over to the Soviet Union.

Japan and the US claimed that the Yalta agreement did not apply to the Northern Territories because they were not a part of the Kuril Islands, although US geographers have traditionally listed them as part of the Kuril chain. In a 1998 article in the journal Pacific Affairs, Bruce Elleman, Michael Nichols and Matthew Ouimet argue that the US never accepted the cession of all the Kuril Islands to the Soviet Union and has maintained from Yalta onward that it simply agreed at Yalta that Moscow could negotiate directly with Tokyo to come to a mutually acceptable solution, and that the US would support in such a peace agreement the Soviet acquisition of the Kurils. As a key piece of evidence, the same article quotes an 27 August 1945, letter from U.S. president Harry Truman to Soviet Premier Joseph Stalin: "You evidently misunderstood my message [about the Kuril Islands] ... I was not speaking of any territory of the Soviet Republic. I was speaking of the Kurile Islands, Japanese territory, disposition of which must be made at a peace settlement. I was advised that my predecessor agreed to support in the peace settlement the Soviet acquisition of those islands." The Soviet Union—and subsequently, Russia—rejected this position.

The Potsdam Declaration states the following regarding the Japanese territories: "8. The terms of the Cairo Declaration shall be carried out and Japanese sovereignty shall be limited to the islands of Honshū, Hokkaido, Kyushu, Shikoku and such minor islands as we determine". The islands comprising the Northern Territories are not explicitly included in this list, but the US subsequently maintained, particularly during the preparation of the Treaty of San Francisco, that the phrase "and such minor islands as we determine" could be used to justify transferring the Northern Territories to Japan.

The Cairo Declaration of 1943 did not explicitly mention the Kuril Islands but stated: "Japan will also be expelled from all other territories which she has taken by violence and greed".

Japan later claimed that the Cairo Declaration and the Potsdam Declaration did not apply to the islands on the grounds that they had never belonged to Russia or been claimed by it since the establishment of diplomatic relations between the two countries in 1855, and thus they were not among the territories acquired by Japan "by violence and greed".

=== San Francisco Treaty ===
A substantial dispute regarding the status of the Kuril Islands arose between the U.S. and the Soviet Union during the preparation of the Treaty of San Francisco in 1951. The Treaty was supposed to be a permanent peace treaty between Japan and the Allied Powers of World War II. By that time, the Cold War had already taken hold, and the position of the U.S. in relation to the Yalta and Potsdam agreements had changed considerably. The U.S. had come to maintain that the Potsdam Declaration should take precedence and that strict adherence to the Yalta agreement was not necessary since, in the view of the U.S., the Soviet Union itself violated several provisions of the Yalta agreement in relation to the rights of other countries. The Soviet Union vehemently disagreed and demanded that the U.S. adhere to its promises made to the Soviet Union in Yalta as a condition of the Soviet Union's entry into the war with Japan. A particular point of disagreement at the time was that the draft text of the treaty, while stating that Japan will renounce all rights to Southern Sakhalin and the Kuril Islands, did not state explicitly that Japan would recognize the Soviet Union's sovereignty over these territories.

The Treaty of San Francisco was signed by 49 nations, including Japan and the United States, on 8 September 1951. Article (2c) states:

Japan renounces all right, title and claim to the Kurile Islands, and to that portion of Sakhalin and the islands adjacent to it over which Japan acquired sovereignty as a consequence of the Treaty of Portsmouth of 5 September 1905.

The State Department later clarified that "the Habomai Islands and Shikotan ... are properly part of Hokkaido and that Japan is entitled to sovereignty over them". Britain and the United States agreed that territorial rights would not be granted to nations that did not sign the Treaty of San Francisco, and therefore the islands were not formally recognized as Soviet territory.

The Soviet Union refused to sign the Treaty of San Francisco and publicly stated that the Kuril Islands issue was one of the reasons for its opposition to the Treaty. Japan signed and ratified the San Francisco treaty. However, both the Japanese government and most of the Japanese media currently claim that already at the time of the 1951 San Francisco peace conference, Japan held that the islands of Kunashiri, Etorofu, Shikotan and the Habomai Islands were technically not a part of the Kuril Islands and thus were not covered by the provisions of Article (2c) of the treaty. The timing of this claim is disputed by Russia and by some western historians. In a 2005 article in The Japan Times, journalist Gregory Clark writes that official Japanese statements, maps and other documents from 1951, and the statements by the head of the U.S. delegation to the San Francisco conference—John Foster Dulles—make it clear that at the time the San Francisco Treaty was concluded in October 1951, both Japan and the United States considered the islands of Kunashiri and Etorofu to be a part of the Kuril Islands and to be covered by Article (2c) of the Treaty. Clark made a similar point in a 1992 New York Times opinion column.

In a 2001 book, Seokwoo Lee, a Korean scholar of international law, quotes the 19 October 1951, statement in Japan's Diet by Kumao Nishimura, Director of the Treaties Bureau of the Foreign Ministry of Japan, stating that both Etorofu and Kunashiri are a part of the Kuril Islands and thus covered by Article (2c) of the San Francisco Treaty.

The U.S. Senate Resolution of 28 April 1952, ratifying of the San Francisco Treaty, explicitly stated that the Soviet Union had no title to the Kurils, the resolution stating:

As part of such advice and consent the Senate states that nothing the treaty [San Francisco Peace Treaty] contains is deemed to diminish or prejudice, in favor of the Soviet Union, the right, title, and interest of Japan, or the Allied Powers as defined in said treaty, in and to South Sakhalin and its adjacent islands, the Kurile Islands, the Habomai Islands, the Island of Shikotan, or any other territory, rights, or interests possessed by Japan on December 7, 1941, or to confer any right, title, or benefit therein or thereto on the Soviet Union.

The U.S. maintains that until a peace treaty between Japan and Russia is concluded, the disputed Northern Territories remain occupied territory under Russian control via General Order No. 1. According to the Russian Embassy in Japan, "A peace treaty has not yet been concluded between the two countries, due to Tokyo's groundless territorial claims to the southern Kuril Islands."

=== 1956 Soviet–Japanese Joint Declaration ===
During the 1956 peace talks between Japan and the Soviet Union, the Soviet side proposed to settle the dispute by returning Shikotan and Habomai to Japan. In the final round of the talks, the Japanese side accepted the weakness of its claim to Iturup and Kunashiri and agreed to settle on the return of Shikotan and the Habomai Islands, in exchange for a peace treaty. On 19 October 1956, in Moscow, the Soviet Union and Japan signed the Soviet–Japanese Joint Declaration. The Declaration ended the state of war between the Soviet Union and Japan, which technically had still existed between the two countries since August 1945, and stipulated that "The U.S.S.R. and Japan have agreed to continue, after the establishment of normal diplomatic relations between them, negotiations for the conclusion of a peace treaty. Hereby, the U.S.S.R., in response to the desires of Japan and taking into consideration the interest of the Japanese state, agrees to hand over to Japan the Habomai and the Shikotan Islands, provided that the actual changing over to Japan of these islands will be carried out after the conclusion of a peace treaty."

The Joint Declaration did not settle the Kuril Islands dispute, however. In particular, the disagreement emerged over the interpretation of the territorial provisions of the Declaration, despite the Soviet efforts to avoid precisely that. The Soviet position was that the Declaration resolved the dispute and that no territorial demarcation will be discussed beyond promised transfer of Shikotan and Habomai, whilst Japan maintains that negotiations for conclusion of a peace treaty necessarily imply continuation of negotiations over the two larger islands as well.

Continuation of the deadlock is often attributed to the United States' intervention in the negotiations, when the US warned Japan that a withdrawal of the Japanese claim on the other islands would mean the U.S. would keep both Okinawa and the Ryukyu Islands, while asserting that the San Francisco Peace Treaty "did not determine the sovereignty of the territories renounced by Japan", but that "Japan does not have the right to transfer sovereignty over such territories", although this attribution is problematic, since the decision to stand firm on demanding "four island return" (rather than following initial "minimal requirement" line of demanding only Shikotan and Habomai) was made by Japan long before the United States' decision to "morally support" these claims.

==== Dispute over the composition of the Kuril Islands ====
The question of whether Etorofu and Kunashiri islands are a part of the Kurils, and thus whether they are covered by Article (2c) of the Treaty of San Francisco, remains one of the main outstanding issues in the Kuril Islands dispute. Based on a 1966 book by a former Japanese diplomat and a member of the 1956 Japanese delegation for the Moscow peace talks, Clark traces the first Japanese claim that Etorofu and Kunashiri islands are not a part of the Kurils to the 1956 negotiations on the Soviet–Japanese Joint Declaration of 1956. The Soviet Union rejected that view at the time, and Russia has subsequently maintained the same position.

=== 21st-century developments ===
The positions of the two sides have not substantially changed since the 1956 Joint Declaration, and a permanent peace treaty between Japan and Russia has not been concluded.

On 7 July 2005, the European Parliament issued an official statement recommending the return of the territories in dispute, which Russia immediately protested.

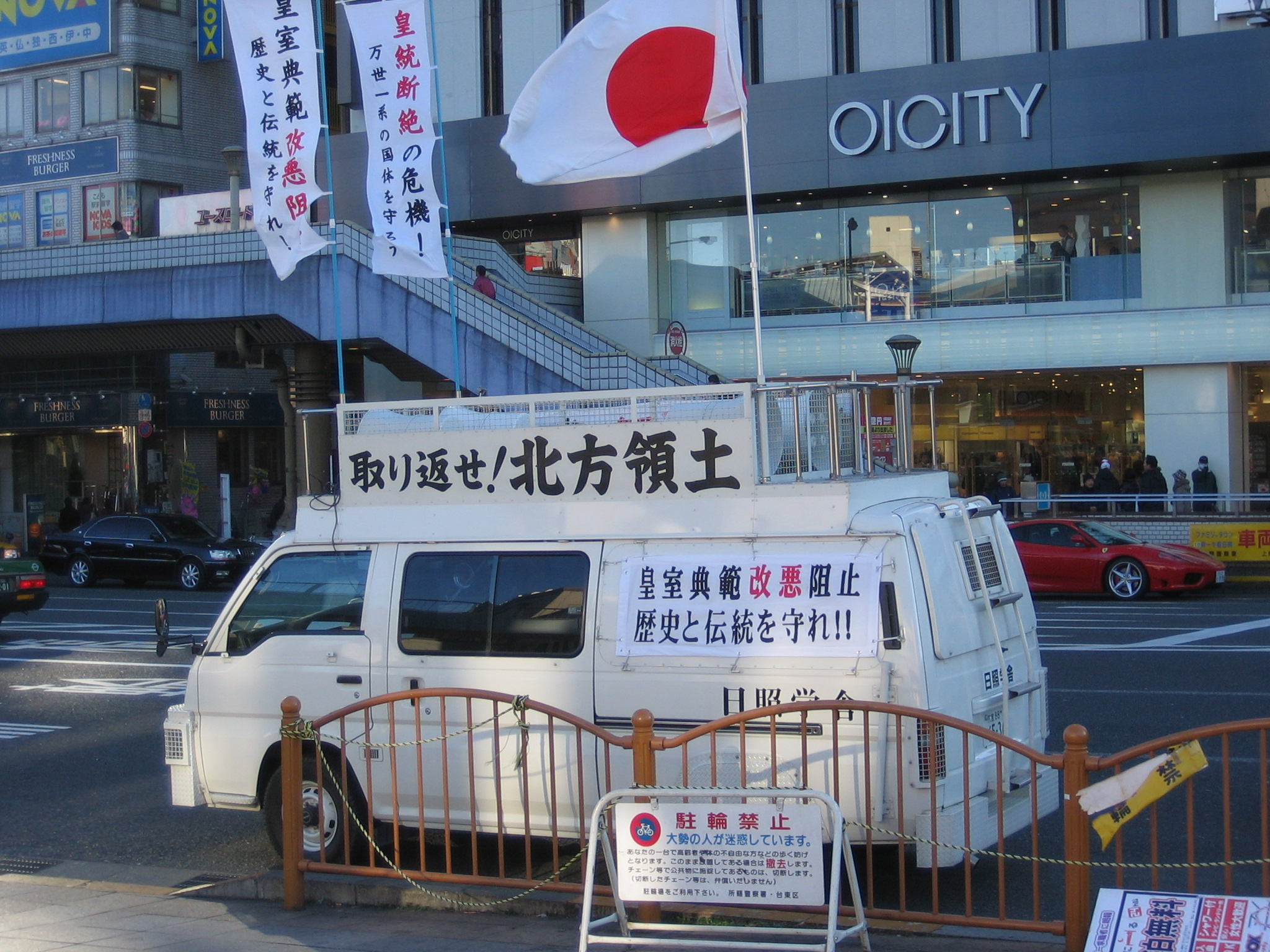
A van covered with slogans calling for Japanese sovereignty over the Northern Territories, 2006

As late as 2006, the Russian government of Vladimir Putin offered Japan the return of Shikotan and the Habomais (about 6% of the disputed area) if Japan would renounce its claims to the other two islands, referring to the Soviet–Japanese Joint Declaration of 1956, which promised Shikotan and the Habomais would be ceded to Japan once a peace treaty was signed.

Japan has offered substantial financial aid to the Kuril Islands if they are handed over. However, by 2007, residents of the islands were starting to benefit from economic growth and improved living standards, arising in particular from expansion in the fish processing industry. As a result, it is thought that islanders are less likely to be won over by Japanese offers of financial support.

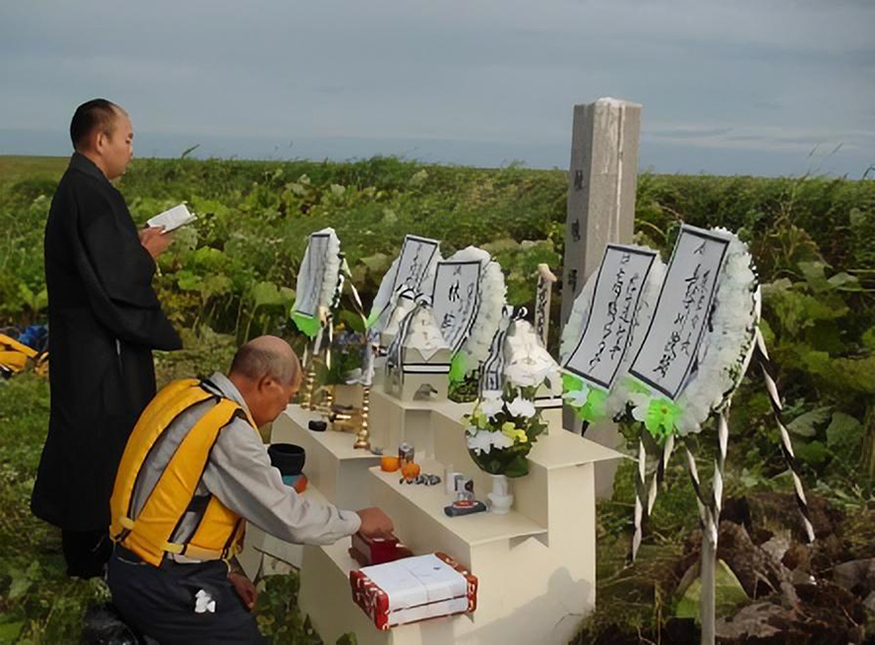
Japanese people visiting their family graves on Tanfiliev Island (Suishō-jima), one of the Habomai Islands, 2008

On 7 February 2008, Reuters reported that Japanese prime minister Yasuo Fukuda stated that he had received a letter from Russian president Vladimir Putin in which Putin expressed a willingness to resolve the territorial dispute, and proposed a new round of talks to do so.

The dispute over the Kuril Islands was exacerbated on 16 July 2008, when the Japanese government published new school textbook guidelines directing teachers to say that Japan has sovereignty over the Southern Kuril Islands. The Russian Ministry of Foreign Affairs announced on 18 July, "[these actions] contribute neither to the development of positive cooperation between the two countries, nor to the settlement of the dispute" and reaffirmed its sovereignty over the islands.

Japanese prime minister Tarō Asō and Russian president Dmitry Medvedev met in Sakhalin on 18 February 2009, to discuss the Kuril Islands issue. Aso said after the meeting that they had agreed to speed up efforts to resolve the dispute so that it would not be left to future generations to find a solution.

Japan pays Russia millions of dollars each year for fishing rights around the disputed islands, effectively acknowledging Russian ownership of the islands.

==== Visa issues ====
Russia has given several concessions to Japan in the dispute. For example, Russia has introduced visa-free trips for Japanese citizens to the Kuril Islands. Japan's fishermen are also allowed to catch fish in Russia's claimed exclusive economic zone.

The Russian Head of the Kuril Region has called for dropping the visa-free programme and Japanese fishermen were fired upon for allegedly fishing illegally in Russian waters. A Japanese fisherman was shot dead by a Russian patrol in 2006.

==== Visit by President Medvedev ====
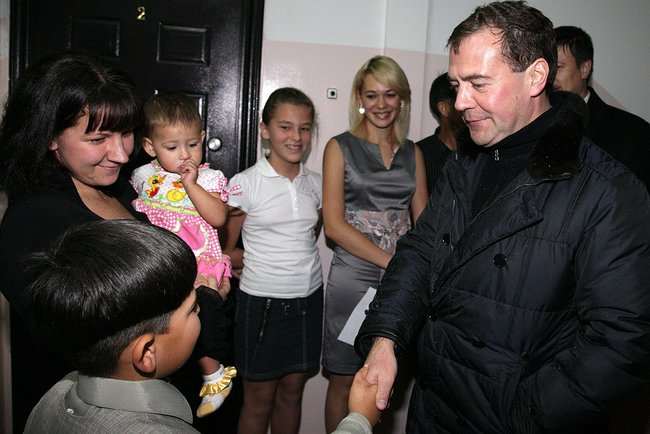
Russian president Dmitry Medvedev meeting local residents in Yuzhno-Kurilsk on 1 November 2010

Russian President Dmitry Medvedev was quoted by Reuters on 29 September 2010, as saying he planned a visit to the disputed islands soon and calling the South Kurils "an important region of our country". The Japanese Foreign Ministry criticized Medvedev's statement, calling it regrettable. Many analysts also viewed that the announcement of the visit is correlated with the recent joint declaration regarding World War II between China and Russia, and linked to the Senkaku Islands dispute between Japan and Taiwan. On 1 November, Medvedev visited Kunashir Island, sparking a row with Japan. The visit by Medvedev was seen in Moscow as a signal to Japan that its loudspeaker diplomacy on the islands would fail. Japanese prime minister Naoto Kan called this visit "impermissible rudeness" and subsequently recalled his country's ambassador to Moscow. The day after the visit, Russian foreign minister Sergei Lavrov said Medvedev planned more visits to the disputed islands, sparking a warning from Tokyo.

==== Reinforcement of defenses ====
On 10 February 2011, President Dmitry Medvedev ordered advanced weapons to be deployed on the Kuril Islands, "in order to ensure the security of the islands as an integral part of Russia". On 15 February, plans for deploying advanced anti-air missiles systems on the Islands were announced. According to a military source interviewed by Russia Today, as part of the reinforcements, the 18th Machine Gun Artillery Division may be upgraded to a modern motorized infantry brigade. The division is to receive an air defense brigade, possibly armed with S-400 SAM systems, according to the Russian General Staff. The Russian military has also announced intention to deploy the new Mistral-class amphibious assault ships, and one Steregushchiy-class corvette in its Pacific Fleet to protect the islands. Russia signed a deal with France in January 2011 to buy four Mistral-class vessels. However, the deal was canceled before the transfer of any of them.

On 25 March 2016, Russian Minister of Defence Sergey Shoygu announced that Bal rocket systems in Kunashir, Bastion in Iturup and Eleron-3 UAVs are going to be stationed on the Kuril Islands within that year.

==== Russian fighter jets intrusion ====
On 7 February 2013, Russian Su-27 fighter jets entered airspace over Japanese territorial waters north of the island of Hokkaido. Japan Air Self-Defense Force F-2s were scrambled in response. Russia had been conducting scheduled flights over the Kuril Islands, but a spokesman for the Russian Air Force said that none of their aircraft entered Japanese airspace. This is the first incursion by Russian aircraft since 2008.

==== 2013 Abe visit to Moscow ====
After winning the 2012 Japanese election, Prime Minister Shinzō Abe made good on promises to restart talks on the disputed nature of the islands. At the end of April 2013, he visited Moscow for discussion with Russian president Vladimir Putin. Abe said: "The potential for cooperation has not been unlocked sufficiently and it is necessary to increase the cooperation between our countries as partners"; he added that he intended to have a good personal relationship with Putin as a basis for resolving the dispute.

==== 2017 Abe visit to Vladivostok ====
Prime Minister Shinzō Abe and Russian president Vladimir Putin met at the Eastern Economic Forum, which was held at the Far Eastern Federal University in Vladivostok.

==== 2018 Abe visit to Vladivostok ====
Russian President and Japanese Prime minister met in Eastern Economic Forum in September 2018. Putin said, "We agreed to hold the third Japanese–Russian business mission to the South Kuril Islands by the end of this year, after which the fourth round of negotiations on joint activities will take place."

On 12 September 2018, Russian president Vladimir Putin offered Japanese prime minister Shinzo Abe a peace treaty "before the end of the year, without any preconditions". Abe did not respond. Japanese Chief Cabinet Secretary Yoshihide Suga said "there is absolutely no change to our country's perspective of resolving the problem of rights over the Northern Territories before sealing a peace treaty".

==== 2018 East Asia Summit ====
At the Thirteenth East Asia Summit (November 2018) in Singapore, Shinzo Abe followed up on Vladimir Putin's proposal from September in Vladivostok. He said that the leaders would seek a peace treaty to the terms of the 1956 Soviet–Japanese Joint Declaration. The declaration gave Japan the Habomai islet group and Shikotan while the Soviet Union claimed the remaining islands, but the United States did not allow the 1956 treaty. Putin and Abe agreed that the terms of the 1956 deal would be part of a bilateral peace treaty.

==== January 2019 talks in Moscow ====
The Japanese foreign minister Taro Kono visited Moscow and held talks on the Kuril Islands dispute with Russian foreign minister Sergey Lavrov on 14 January 2019. At the conclusion of their meeting, Lavrov said that they agreed on wanting to increase ties between the two countries but serious differences remained between the Russian and Japanese positions on the issue. He also said that Japan must recognize them as sovereign Russian territory as a start. In a statement to reporters he had said "Russia's sovereignty over the islands isn't subject to discussion. They are part of the territory of the Russian Federation." A couple days later on 16 January, Lavrov questioned whether or not Japan has accepted the result of World War II.

A meeting between Vladimir Putin and Shinzō Abe on 22 January also did not bring about breakthrough.

==== 2020 Russia deploys missile systems ====
In October 2020, Russia said it planned to deploy an anti-air missile system for military drills on the Kuril Islands. On 1 December 2020, Russian Defence Ministry's Zvezda TV station reported that Russia deployed several S-300V4 versions of the S-300VM missile system for combat duty on the disputed island Iturup. There were already short-range anti-aircraft missiles systems on Iturup.

==== 2021 Mishustin visit to Iturup Island ====
On 26 July 2021, Russian prime minister Mikhail Mishustin visited the Iturup Island. Mishustin said Moscow planned to set up a special economic zone with no customs duties and a reduced set of taxes on the island chain.

==== 2022 return to old stance and halting of peace treaty talks ====
On 7 March 2022, Prime Minister of Japan Fumio Kishida declared that the southern Kurils are "a territory peculiar to Japan, a territory in which Japan has sovereignty." On 8 March, Foreign Minister Yoshimasa Hayashi described the four islands as an "integral part" of Japan. This was in response to the Russian invasion of Ukraine. The Japanese leadership had been reluctant to use language that could be seen as provocative by Russia when discussing the islands in recent years. When Shinzo Abe was asked if he considered the islands to be an integral part of Japan in 2019, he declined to respond so as not to damage negotiations with Russia. However, following the outbreak of Russia's war against Ukraine and the imposition of sanctions against Russia, the Japanese government has returned to a more hardline stance on the islands, as shown by Kishida's statement.

On 21 March 2022, Russia announced its withdrawal from peace treaty talks with Japan and the freezing of joint economic projects related to the disputed Kuril Islands due to sanctions imposed by Japan over Ukraine.

On 25 March 2022, Russia started a military drill with over 3,000 troops and hundreds of vehicles on the Kuril Islands, including the disputed islands.

On 31 March 2022, Japan redesignated the disputed islands as being under an "illegal occupation" in a draft for the 2022 Diplomatic Bluebook.

On 7 June 2022, Russian Foreign Ministry spokeswoman Maria Zakharova announced Russia's intent to cancel a 1998 agreement with Japan allowing Japanese fishermen to operate near the southern Kuril Islands, claiming that Japan is not meeting the financial obligations outlined in the agreement.

On 5 September 2022, a document was published signed by Prime Minister Mikhail Mishustin about Russia's unilateral withdrawal from a visa agreement which allowed former Japanese residents to visit the disputed islands without visas. The Russian lawmaker said this was due to Japan's participation in international sanctions against Russia over the war in Ukraine.

==== Japan reaffirms its position that the islands are illegally occupied ====
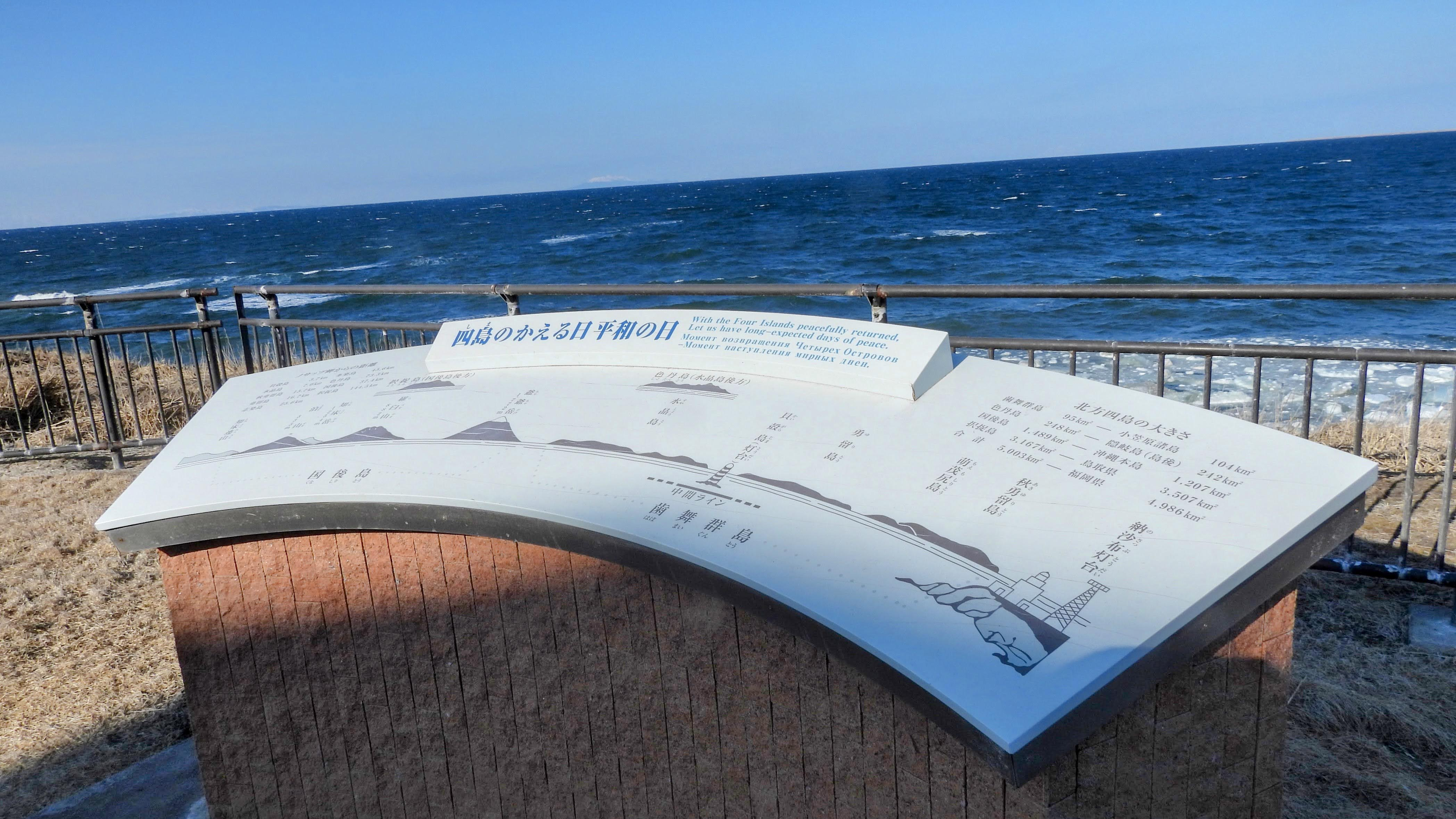
A Japanese installation at the Kuril Islands lookout in Cape Nosappu, detailing the size and shape of the disputed islands

On 7 February 2023, the 168th anniversary of the 1855 Treaty of Shimoda, Japan reaffirmed its position that it considers the four islands to be illegally occupied by Russia. In a statement, Fumio Kishida stated that "It is completely unacceptable that the Northern Territories have yet to be returned since the Soviet Union's illegal occupation of them 77 years ago". This was the first time in 5 years that the Japanese government had used the term "illegal occupation" when referring to the four islands.

On 22 March 2023, Russia said it deployed a division of its Bastion coastal defense missile systems to Paramushir. Defence Minister Sergei Shoigu said it was to bolster Russian security around the Kuril Islands and partly in response to the United States' efforts to "contain" Russia and China.

On 21 April 2023, Russia's prosecutor general designated the League of Residents of Chishima and Habomai Islands (Chishima Renmei) "an undesirable organization". These former residents of the islands are likely barred from visiting the four disputed islands.

==== 2026 visit to Iturup by Vladimir Putin ====
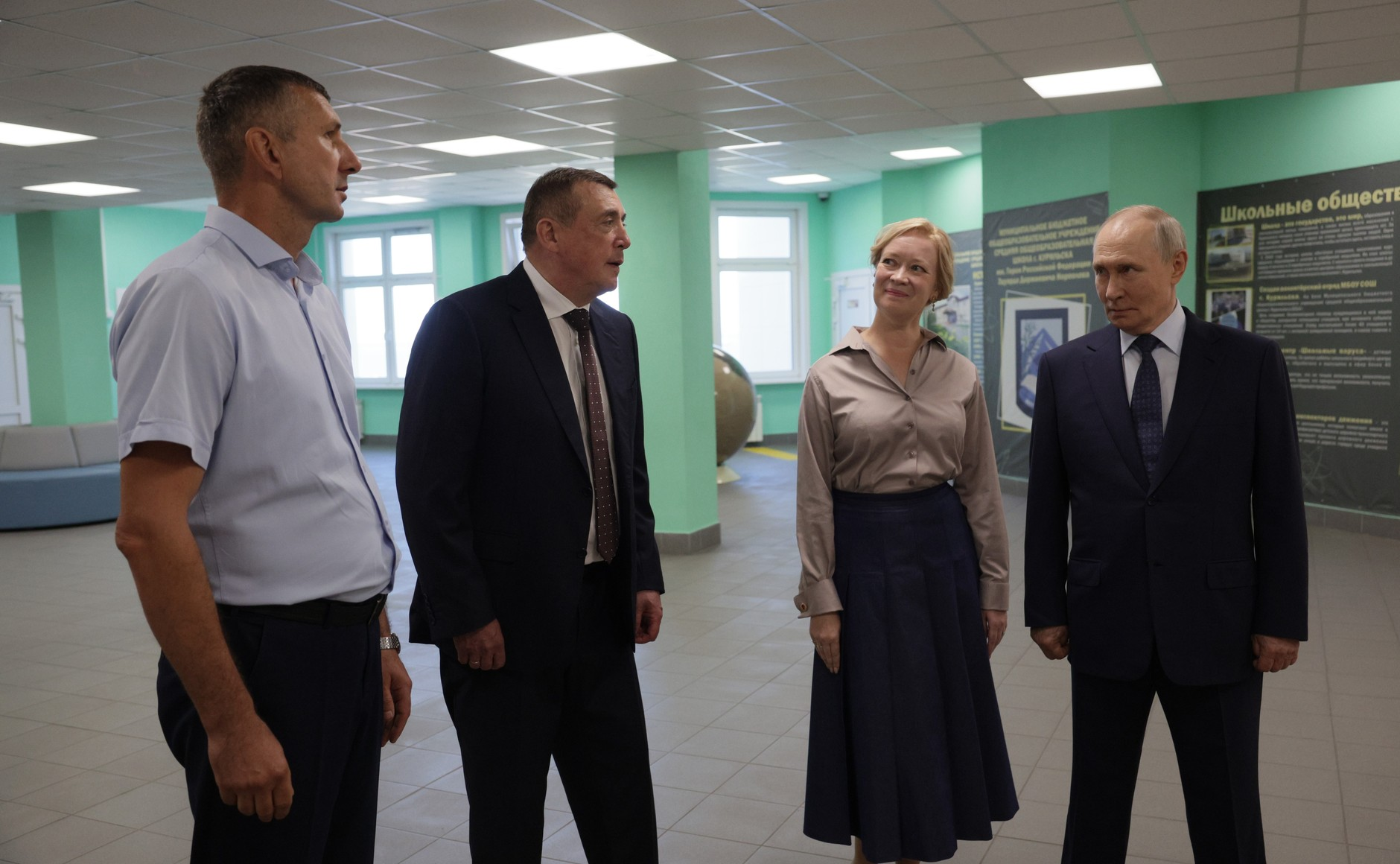
Vladimir Putin during his 2026 visit to Iturup

On 13 August 2026, Russian President Vladimir Putin toured a school, hospital, and fish-processing plant on Iturup, marking his first trip to the Kuril Islands. Japan's foreign ministry summoned the Russian ambassador and strongly protested the visit, while Japanese Prime Minister Sanae Takaichi stated the visit was "absolutely unacceptable" and had "worsened Japanese sentiment towards Russia". Putin and later the Russian foreign ministry rejected their Japanese counterparts' statements and Japan's claims to the southern Kurils, asserting that Russian sovereignty had already been settled by post-WWII agreements.

== Current views ==
=== Japan's view ===
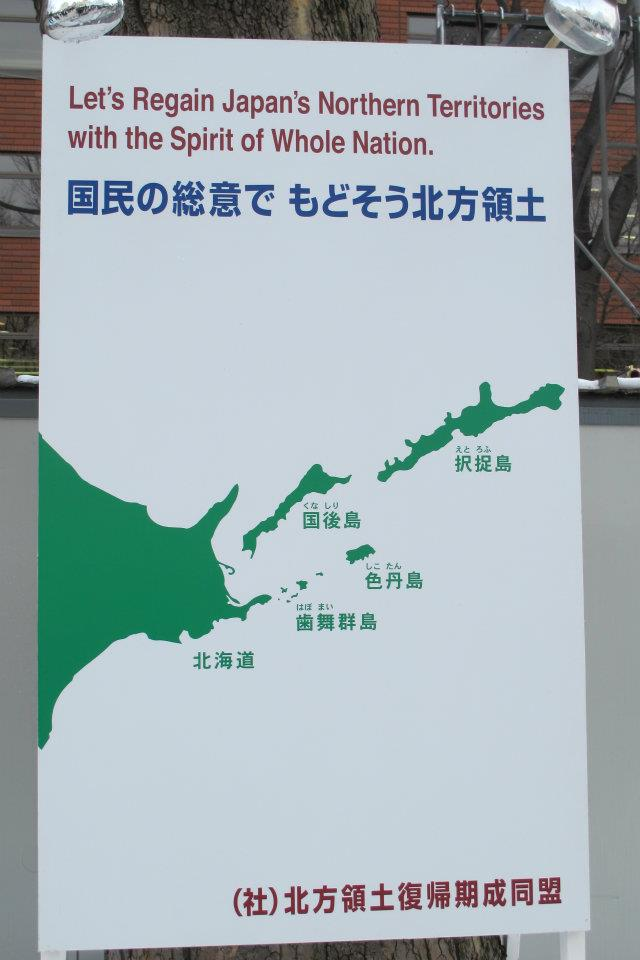
Poster in Sapporo, Hokkaido, supporting Japan's claims to the Southern Kurils/Northern Territories, 2012

Japan's current view of the dispute is given in the official pamphlet of the Japanese Ministry of Foreign Affairs:

- The Cairo Declaration and the Potsdam Declaration did not apply to the disputed islands because those islands had never belonged to Russia even before 1904–1905.
- Russia had not previously claimed the disputed islands since it began diplomatic relations with Japan in 1855. Therefore, the disputed islands could not be considered part of the territories acquired by Japan "by violence and greed".
- The Yalta Agreement "did not determine the final settlement of the territorial problem, as it was no more than a statement by the then leaders of the Allied Powers as to principles of the postwar settlement. (Territorial issues should be settled by a peace treaty.) Furthermore, Japan is not bound by this document, to which it did not agree."
- The Soviet Union's 1945 entry into the war against Japan was a violation of the Soviet–Japanese Neutrality Pact, and the occupation of the islands was therefore a violation of international law. Although the Soviet Union renounced the neutrality pact on 5 April 1945, Japan contends that the pact remained in effect until 25 April 1946, the 5 year anniversary of the pact's ratification. However possibility of denunciation was described in third article of the pact: "In case neither of the Contracting Parties denounces the Pact one year before the expiration of the term, it will be considered automatically prolonged for the next five years."
- Although by the terms of Article (2c) of the 1951 San Francisco treaty, Japan renounced all rights to the Kuril Islands, the Japanese government claims that the islands of Kunashiri, Etorofu, Shikotan and Habomai are not part of the Kuril Islands but "Northern Territories". Also, the Soviet Union did not sign the San Francisco treaty.
- In addition, the Japanese government renounced its sovereignty over southern Sakhalin and the Kuril Islands from Sims to Urup, but the San Francisco Peace Treaty did not specify which country it belonged to, and the Soviet Union did not sign the treaty. Therefore, it claims that the land is undetermined under international law according to Article 25 of the treaty.

==== Public attitudes in Japan ====
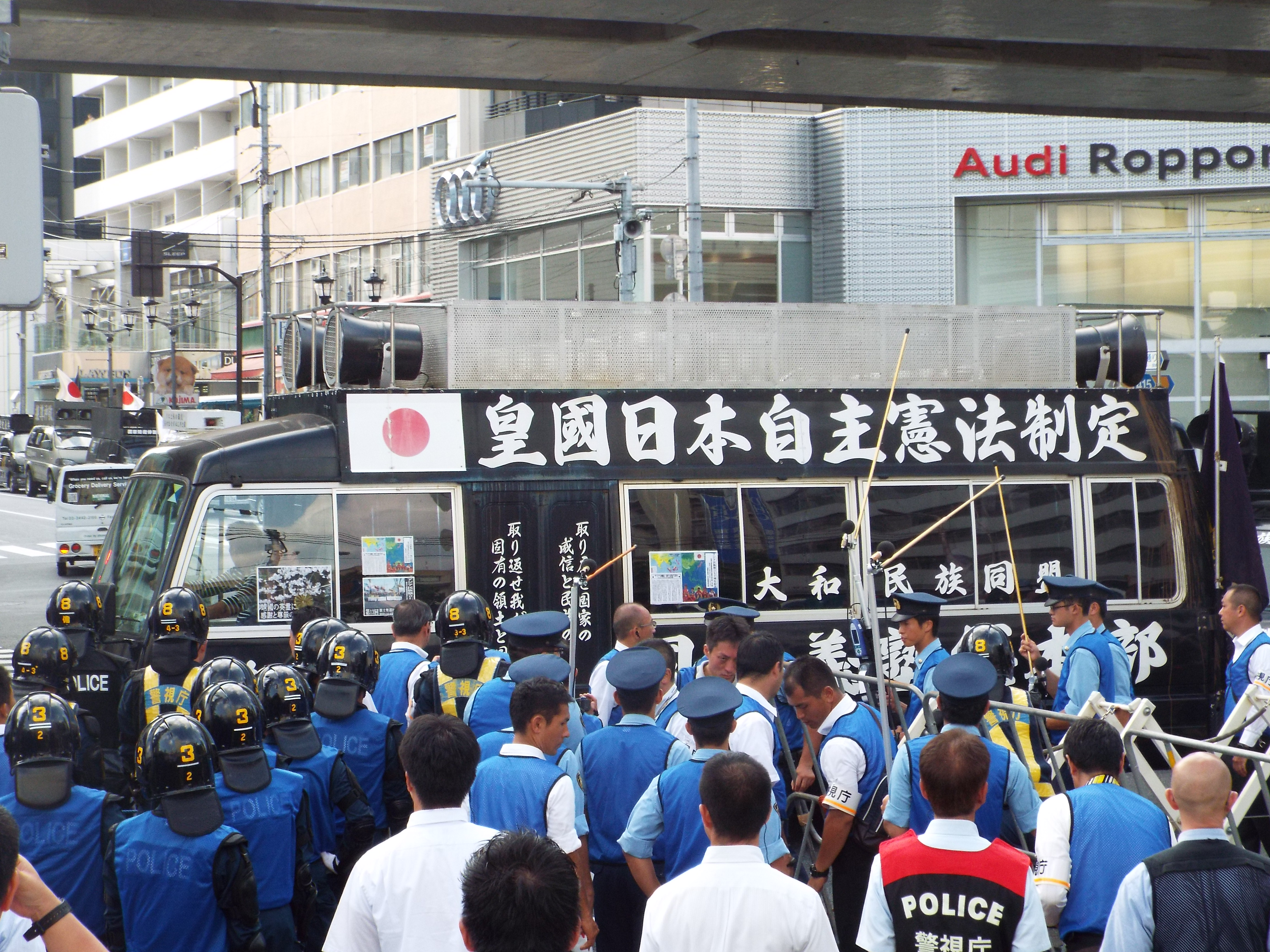
A protest truck confronting Japanese police near the Russian embassy in Tokyo on 9 August 2015

In Japan, there are various private groups cooperating with local and national government to encourage the Japanese people to push for the return of the islands. One man whose family was evicted from the islands, Kenjirō Suzuki, heads the Tokachi branch of the League of Chishima Habomai Islands Residents (Chishima is the Japanese name for the Kuril Islands). In 2008, the main organization had a budget of approximately 187 million yen (US$1.7 million).

In 2018 the National Museum of Territory and Sovereignty (currently located in the Toranomon Mitsui Building, Chiyoda-ku, Tokyo) was established by the Japanese government to raise public awareness of Japanese territorial rights issues concerning the Kuril Islands dispute, as well as issues concerning territorial claims to Takeshima and Senkaku Islands.

Many former Japanese residents of the disputed islands and their descendants live in Japan, and since 1964 some have been allowed to visit family graves for humanitarian reasons. However, they have long sought easier access, and the ability to land on islands other than Kunashir. In 2018, Russia started to allow visits to the smaller islands in the archipelago, under a new system involving checks of tour ships as they approached from the sea. The new procedure to process entry requests to the four Russian-held islands was expected to reduce travel time from five hours to about three hours.

=== Russia's view ===
Russia maintains that all the Kuril Islands, including those that Japan calls the Northern Territories, are legally a part of Russia as a result of World War II, and the acquisition was as proper as any other change of international boundaries following the war. Moscow cites the following points:

- The explicit language of the Yalta Agreement gave the Soviet Union a right to the Kurils, and the Soviet Union upheld its own obligations under that treaty.
- Russia inherited possession of the islands from the former Soviet Union, as its successor state, in accordance with international law.
- The Japanese assertion that the disputed islands are not part of the Kurils is simply a tactic to bolster Japan's territorial claim and is not supported by history or geography.

On 21 December 2018, Russian president Vladimir Putin said at his annual news conference that the United States' military presence in Japan was complicating the search for a formal peace treaty between Moscow and Tokyo. Putin told reporters that Moscow was concerned by the deployment of a U.S. air defense system in Japan.

In March 2022, Dmitry Medvedev, deputy Chair of the Security Council of Russia, admitted that Russia was never serious about reaching a territorial agreement. He said: "Obviously, we would never have found any consensus with Japan on the island issue ... Negotiations about the Kurils always had a ritualistic character. The new version of the constitution of the Russian Federation [which was introduced in 2020] directly states that our country's territories are not subject to alienation. The question is closed."

==== Public attitudes in Russia ====
In Russia, most of the population and mass media strongly oppose any territorial concessions to Japan. A common view is that the Soviet Union won the Kuril Islands during World War II and is entitled to keep them regardless of the prior history of the disputed territories. Many believe that taking these islands away from Japan was a just reward for the Soviet Union's sacrifices during World War II and for its agreement to enter the war against Japan at the request of its allies. Zemlyak, a Russian political group active in Kunashir during the 1990s, was an exception; it advocated a return of the islands to Japanese sovereignty.

Public polling in Russia has indicated consistent and overwhelming opposition to returning the islands to Japan. According to a July 2009 poll conducted by the All-Russian Public Opinion Research Center (VTsIOM), 89% of respondents were against territorial concessions to Japan in the Kuril Islands dispute, compared to 76% from a similar poll in 1994. A May 2016 poll showed that the percentage of respondents that said they would support giving the islands to Japan was 7%. In November 2018 a similar poll was conducted, and the number supporting giving the islands was at 17%.

=== Ainu view ===
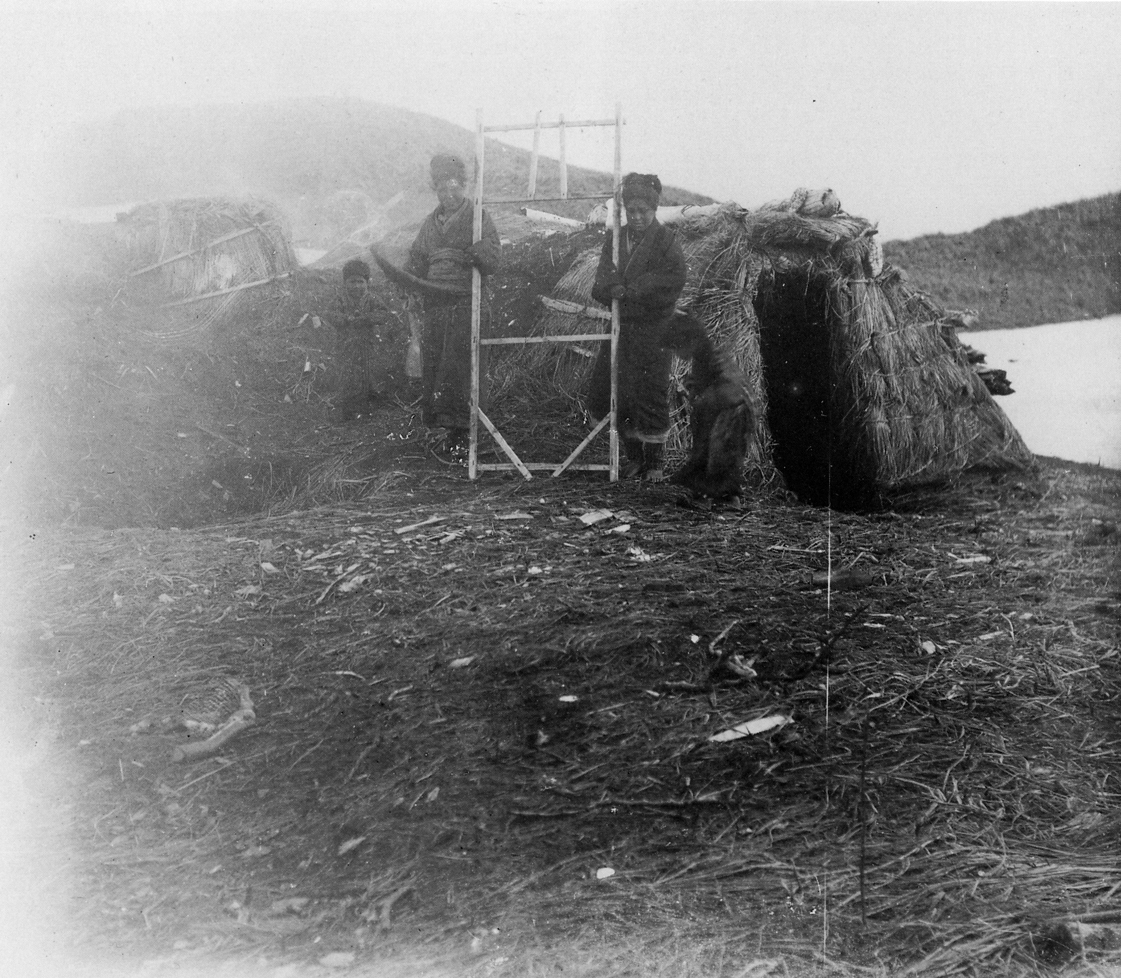
The Ainu people were the original inhabitants of the Kuril Islands.

Some Ainu also claim the Kuril Islands, on the basis that their ethnic group inhabited the archipelago and Sakhalin prior to the arrival of Japanese and Russian settlers in the 19th century.

In 2004, the small Ainu community living in Kamchatka Krai wrote a letter to Vladimir Putin, urging him to reconsider any move to award the Southern Kuril Islands to Japan. In the letter they blamed the Japanese, the Tsarist Russians, and the Soviets for crimes against the Ainu such as killings and assimilation, and they also urged him to recognize the Japanese genocide against the Ainu people, a request which was turned down by Putin.

=== Opinions of third party countries and organizations ===
- China once supported the Soviet Union's claim over the islands in the 1950s; however, after the Sino-Soviet split in the 1960s, China then turned to support Japanese sovereignty of the islands. After the Sino-Soviet border conflict in 1969, maps published in China began to mark the islands as Japanese territory with a note "Occupied by Russia". During a news conference on 27 July 2021, Chinese Foreign Ministry spokesperson Zhao Lijian commented on the issue of Russian–Japanese dispute of the islands. He said, "It is China's consistent belief that the outcomes of the victorious anti-fascist war should be earnestly respected and upheld." Russia often cites "the results of the victorious war against fascism" to justify its ownership of the islands following the defeat of Imperial Japan in World War II. By saying "the results be respected", China apparently accepted the Russian argument. During a March 2023 meeting in Moscow, General Secretary of the Chinese Communist Party Xi Jinping reportedly told Putin that China "does not take either side" regarding the territorial dispute. This is a shift to neutrality compared to the position of Chairman Mao Zedong who in 1964 said the islands belonged to Japan.
- European Union: The European Parliament issued a resolution "Relations between the EU, China and Taiwan and Security in the Far East", adopted on 7 July 2005, which called on Russia to return to Japan the "occupied" South Kuril Islands.
- Iran has called for bilateral negotiations between Japan and Russia over the ownership of the Kuril Islands.
- North Korea supports Russia, saying southern Kuril Islands "are an inseparable part of Russia and their sovereignty were legally affirmed according to the result of the World War II".
- South Korea is officially neutral in the Russia–Japan conflict over the islands.
- United States: As of 1999 the United States maintained that until a peace treaty between Japan and Russia is concluded, the disputed Northern Territories remain under Russian control via General Order No. 1. In 2014, a U.S. State Department spokeswoman Marie Harf stated that the United States recognized Japan's sovereignty over the islands. Since 2018, the US government has required people seeking permanent residency (known as a green card) to list Japan as their birthplace if they were born on the four disputed islands.
- Ukraine's national parliament, the Verkhovna Rada, voted on 7 October 2022, to recognize the Kuril Islands as integral Japanese territories, illegally occupied by the Russian Federation. The same day President Volodymyr Zelenskyy signed a decree recognizing the Kuril Islands as territory of Japan temporarily occupied by Russia.

== Challenges ==
=== Interests of both parties ===
The meeting between the leaders of two countries that took place on 5 May 2016, in Moscow was expected to make progress toward resolving the prolonged territorial dispute. However, Japanese prime minister Shinzo Abe and Russian president Vladimir Putin focused on the "current state and the prospects of development of bilateral cooperation in trade and economy as well as in the humanitarian field". Close to the end of May, Sergey Shoygu, the Russian Defence Minister, announced that Russia is ready to protect the islands against foreign air traffic over the islands by positioning defense systems along the main islands. Furthermore, on 8 June 2015, there was an order from the Defence Minister to expedite the construction of military facilities on Iturup and Kunashir islands. This news generated a wave of Japanese dissatisfaction. Although Japan objected to the actions of Russia, the latter did not show any signs for changing its plans. On 19 November 2018, Kremlin spokesman Dmitry Peskov stated that upcoming talks about resolving a dispute with Japan over a group of islands claimed by Tokyo would not necessarily result in Russia relinquishing them.

==== Political and strategic issues ====
A Japanese online resource reports that military infrastructure that is springing up in the Kuril Islands is believed to be part of the future plan of "Northern Sea Route", a sea route between the Kara Sea in the Arctic and the Pacific Ocean. The source believes that the route might be in hand to Russia since its power in the Pacific has been weakened for the last several decades. Moreover, the transfer of the Kurils to Japan would escalate territorial disputes Russia has with other countries.

== See also ==
- Foreign relations of Japan
- Japan–Soviet Union relations and Japan–Russia relations
- List of territories occupied by Imperial Japan
- Russian-occupied territories
- Territorial disputes of Japan
