= Exploration of the Pacific =

Early Polynesian explorers reached nearly all Pacific islands by 1200 CE, followed by Asian navigation in Southeast Asia and the West Pacific. During the Middle Ages, Muslim traders linked the Middle East and East Africa to the Asian Pacific coasts, reaching southern China and much of the Malay Archipelago. Direct European contact with the Pacific began in 1512, with the Portuguese encountering its western edges, soon followed by the Spanish arriving from the American coast.

In 1513, Spanish explorer Vasco Núñez de Balboa crossed the Isthmus of Panama and encountered the Pacific Ocean, calling it the South Sea. In 1521, a Spanish expedition led by the Portuguese navigator Ferdinand Magellan was the first recorded crossing of the Pacific Ocean, Magellan then naming it the "peaceful sea." Starting in 1565 with the voyage of Andres de Urdaneta, the Spanish controlled transpacific trade for 250 years; Manila galleons would cross from Mexico to the Philippines, and vice versa, until 1815. Additional expeditions from Mexico and Peru encountered various archipelagos in the North and South Pacific. In the 17th and 18th centuries, other European powers sent expeditions to the Pacific, namely the Dutch Republic, England, France, and Russia.

== History ==
=== Human migration and arrival ===
Polynesian expansion

Humans reached Australia by at least 55,000 BC which implies some degree of water crossing. People were in the Americas before 10,000 BC. One theory holds that the Indigenous Americans travelled along the coast by canoe.

==== Austronesians ====
About 3000 BC, speakers of the Austronesian languages, probably on the island of Formosa (nowadays Taiwan), mastered the art of long-distance canoe travel and spread themselves, or their languages, south to the Philippines and Malesia and east to the islands of Micronesia and Melanesia. The Polynesians branched off and occupied Polynesian Triangle to the east. Dates and routes are uncertain, but they seem to have started from the Bismarck Archipelago, went east past Fiji to Samoa and Tonga about 1500 BC. By 100 AD they were in the Marquesas Islands and 300-800 AD in Tahiti (Tahiti is west of the Marquesas.) 300-800 AD is also given for their arrival at Easter Island, their easternmost point and the same date range for Hawaii, which is far to the north and distant from other islands. Far to the southwest, New Zealand was reached about 1250 AD. The Chatham Islands, about 500 miles east of New Zealand were reached about 1500. The fact that some Polynesians possessed the South American sweet potato implies that they may have reached the Americas or, conversely, that people from the Americas may have reached Polynesia. Thor Heyerdahl's Kon-Tiki expedition successfully demonstrated that the trip from the Americas to Polynesia using only materials and technology available at the time was at least possible, even if highly improbable.

==== Asians ====
On the Asian side long-distance trade developed all along the coast from Mozambique to Japan. Trade, and therefore knowledge, extended to Indonesia but apparently not Australia. By at the latest 878 when there was a significant Islamic settlement in Canton much of this trade was controlled by Arabs or Muslims. In 219 BC Xu Fu sailed out into the Pacific searching for the elixir of immortality. Zheng He (1371–1433) was China's greatest explorer, mariner, and navigator.

Japanese fishing boats, if blown out to sea, could be carried by the current all the way to North America. Japanese boats reached Acapulco in 1617, the Aleutians in 1782, Alaska in 1805, the mouth of the Columbia River in 1820, and Cape Flattery in 1833. Such trips may have taken place before Europeans were present in those areas to make detailed records of them.

=== European exploration ===
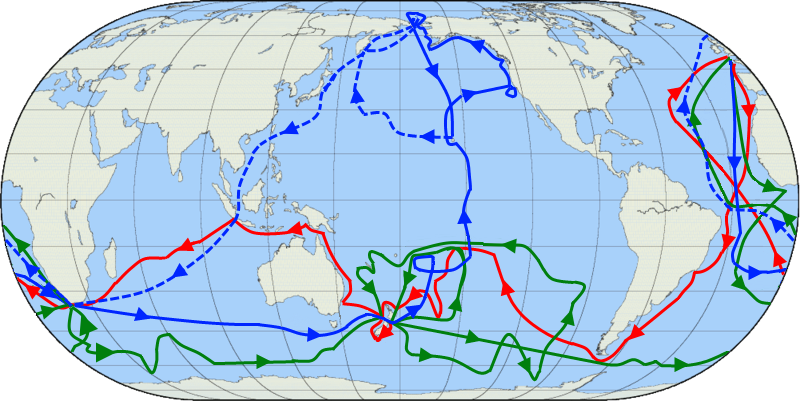
The voyages of Captain Cook in the Pacific
First voyage (1768–1771)
Second voyage (1772–1775)
Third voyage (1776–1779)

Ferdinand Magellan discovered the Strait of Magellan leading into the Pacific in 1520

==== Iberian pioneers ====
The first contact of European navigators with the western edge of the Pacific Ocean was made by the Portuguese expeditions of António de Abreu and Francisco Serrão, via the Lesser Sunda Islands, to the Maluku Islands, in 1512, and with Jorge Álvares's expedition to southern China in 1513, both ordered by Afonso de Albuquerque from Malacca.

The Spanish explorer Balboa was the first European to sight the Pacific from America in 1513 after his expedition crossed the Isthmus of Panama and reached a new ocean. He named it Mar del Sur (literally, "Sea of the South" or "South Sea") because the ocean was to the south of the coast of the isthmus where he first observed the Pacific. Starting in 1519, Portuguese explorer Ferdinand Magellan sailed the Pacific East to West on a Castilian (Spanish) expedition, which concluded later with the first world circumnavigation by the Basque sailor Juan Sebastián Elcano. Magellan called the ocean Pacífico (or "Pacific" meaning, "peaceful") because, after sailing through the stormy seas off Patagonia, the expedition found calm waters. The ocean was often called the Sea of Magellan in his honor until the eighteenth century.

From 1565 to 1815, a Spanish transpacific route known as the Manila galleons regularly crossed from Mexico to the Philippines and back. On the Asian side the Portuguese and later the Dutch built a regular trade from the East Indies to Japan. On the American side Spanish power stretched thousands of miles from Mexico to Chile. The vast central Pacific was visited only by the Manila galleons and an occasional explorer. The south Pacific was first crossed by Spanish expeditions in the 16th century who discovered many islands including Tuvalu, the Marquesas, the Cook Islands, the Solomon Islands, and the Admiralty Islands, and later the Pitcairn and Vanuatu archipelagos.

Spanish explorations and routes across the Pacific Ocean.

==== The Pacific recognized ====
Europeans knew that there was a vast ocean to the west, and the Chinese knew that there was one to the east. Learned Europeans thought that the world was round and that the two oceans were one. In 1492, Columbus sailed west to what he thought was Asia. When Pedro Álvares Cabral, en route to Asia via the Atlantic and the Indian oceans, reached Brazil, in 1500, the true extent of the Americas began to become known. The Martin Waldseemüller map of 1507 was the first to show the Americas separating two distinct oceans. This guess was confirmed in 1513, when Balboa crossed Panama and found salt water. The Magellan expedition of 1519-22 proved that there was one continuous ocean from the Americas to Asia. The Diogo Ribeiro map of 1529 was the first to show the Pacific at about its proper size.

==== The coast of Asia ====
The Portuguese reached India in 1498, conquered Malacca in 1511 and in 1512 António de Abreu and Francisco Serrão reached the Spice Islands. In May 1513 Jorge Álvares reached southern China and in the same year Balboa crossed Panama. In 1525 Diogo da Rocha and Gomes de Sequeira reached the Caroline Islands, and Jorge de Menezes in 1526-27 landed on the Islands of Don Jorge de Menezes, in the northwest coast of New Guinea (now part of Indonesia), and named the region Ilhas dos Papuas and is thus credited with the European discovery of Papua. In 1542 Fernão Mendes Pinto reached Japan. From about 1543 until 1614, the Portuguese monopolize the trade between China and Japan, through the nanban trade. In 1589, João da Gama reached Hokkaido and possibly sighted the Kuril Islands, crossing the Pacific further north of the routes usually taken until then. The land that he eventually discovered northeast of Japan, has since become a matter of legend and controversy.

One hundred years after the Spanish and Portuguese the Dutch Republic began its remarkable expansion. The Dutch reached the East Indies in 1596, the Spice Islands in 1602 and in 1619 founded Batavia. In 1600 a Dutch fleet reached Japan from the Strait of Magellan. The Dutch had little success in China but established themselves at Hirado, Nagasaki in 1609 and monopolized the Japan trade from 1639. In 1639 Matthijs Quast and Abel Tasman searched the empty ocean east of Japan looking for two islands called 'Rica de Oro' and 'Rica de Plata'. In 1643 Maarten Gerritsz Vries reached and charted Sakhalin and the Kuril Islands. In 1653 Hendrick Hamel was shipwrecked in Korea. At about this time the Russians reached the Pacific overland via Siberia (see below). It is significant that the Russian and Dutch trades were never linked since Siberian furs might easily have been exported to China at great profit.

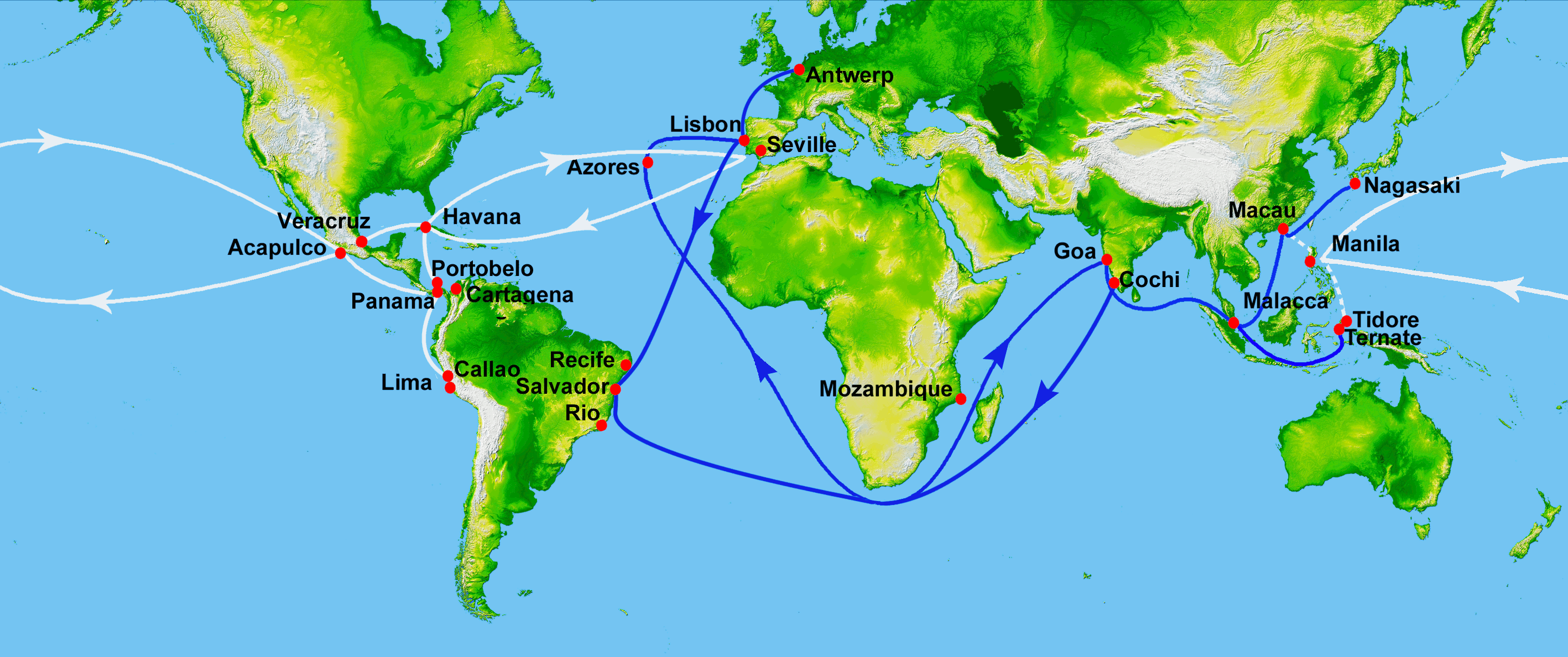
Portuguese trade routes (blue) and Spanish trade routes (white) in the 16th century.

==== Magellan and the Manila Galleons ====
In 1519, Ferdinand Magellan sailed down the east coast of South America, found and sailed through the strait that bears his name. On 28 November 1520, he entered the Pacific. Magellan then sailed north and caught the trade winds which carried him across the Pacific to the Philippines where he was killed. One surviving ship returned west across the Indian Ocean and the other went north in the hope of finding the westerlies and reaching Mexico. Unable to find the right winds, it was forced to return to the East Indies. In 1565 (44 years later), Andrés de Urdaneta found a wind system that would reliably blow a ship eastward back to the Americas. From then until 1815 the annual Manila Galleons crossed the Pacific from Mexico to the Philippines and back, exchanging Mexican silver for spices and porcelain. Until the time of Captain James Cook these were the only large ships to regularly cross the Pacific. The route was purely commercial and there was no exploration of the areas to the north and south. In 1668, the Spanish founded a colony on Guam as a resting place for west-bound galleons. For a long time this was the only non-coastal European settlement in the Pacific.

==== South America ====
In 1513, six years before Magellan, Spanish explorer Vasco Núñez de Balboa crossed the Isthmus of Panama and saw the Pacific Ocean. In 1517–18, two ships were built on the Pacific coast. In 1522, Pascual de Andagoya sailed the coast as far as Ecuador. In 1532, Francisco Pizarro conquered Peru. A regular trade developed that carried Peruvian silver up the coast to Panama where it was carried overland to the Caribbean and part to Spain. Spanish settlement extended as far south as central Chile. In 1557–58, Juan Fernández Ladrillero discovered the Juan Fernandez islands and explored the Chilean coast down to the Strait of Magellan.

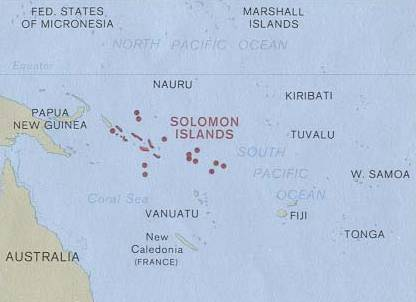
Western Islands reached from South America

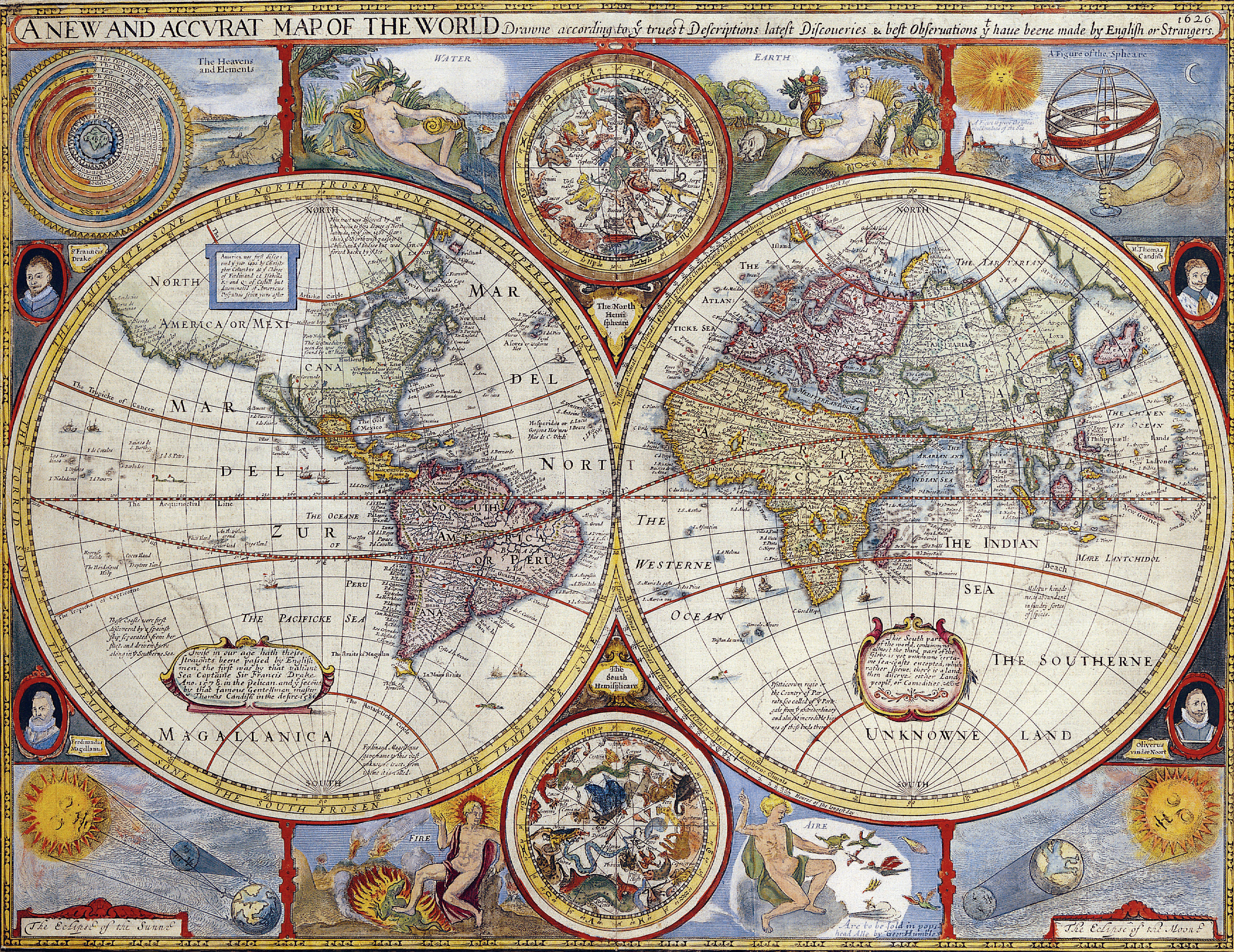
"A New and Accurate Map of the World" of 1627, possibly by John Speed. Western North America north of Mexico is a guess; the Bering Strait is described as the Strait of Anian; Japan and other Pacific Islands are distorted; only the north coast of New Guinea is depicted; no Australia is shown; and there is a huge 'Southern Unknowne Land' in the south.

==== The South Pacific ====
Several Spanish expeditions were sent from South America across the Pacific Ocean in the 16th and early 17th centuries. They all used the southern trade winds. In 1567/68, Álvaro de Mendaña de Neira sailed from Peru to the Solomon Islands. In 1595, he tried again and reached the Santa Cruz Islands (eastern Solomons toward Fiji). He died there and the survivors reached the Philippines. In 1606, Pedro Fernandes de Queirós reached Vanuatu south of the Solomons. He continued exploring and eventually sailed back to Mexico. One of his separated ships under Luis Vaz de Torres sailed west and discovered the strait that bears his name sighting the northern tip of Australia. Other Spanish expeditions discovered Tuvalu, the Marquesas, the Cook Islands, the Admiralty Islands and the Pitcairn. In 1722, the Dutchman Jacob Roggeveen sailed from Cape Horn to Batavia and discovered Easter Island and Samoa.

===== Cape Horn =====
Six years after Magellan, in 1526, one of the ships of the Loaísa expedition sailed through the Strait of Magellan and followed the coast north to Mexico. In 1578, Francis Drake passed through the Strait, sailed north raiding Spanish ships during his successful circumnavigation. On 5 June 1579, the ship briefly made first landfall at South Cove, Cape Arago, just south of Coos Bay, Oregon, and then sailed south while searching for a suitable harbour to repair his ailing ship. On 17 June, Drake and his crew found a protected cove when they landed on the Pacific coast of what is now Northern California. While ashore, he claimed the area for Queen Elizabeth I as Nova Albion or New Albion. In 1580, Pedro Sarmiento de Gamboa, who was hunting for Drake, was the first to sail from the Strait to Europe. In 1587, Thomas Cavendish followed Drake, captured a Manila galleon and returned via the Pacific and the Indian Ocean. In 1599, the first Dutch ships passed through the Strait of Magellan (Will Adams, the first Englishman to reach Japan, was on board). Olivier van Noort followed and became the first Dutch circumnavigator.

In 1525, Francisco de Hoces, while trying to enter the Strait as part of the Loaisa expedition, was blown south by a storm and saw what he thought was land's end. In 1578, Drake was blown south on the west side and saw what he thought was open water. In 1616, Willem Schouten sought a more southerly passage and rounded Cape Horn. In 1619, the Garcia de Nodal expedition followed the Dutch and proved that Tierra del Fuego was an island by circumnavigating it. Since the Strait of Magellan is narrow and hard to navigate Cape Horn became the standard route until the opening of the Panama Canal. It is a measure of the difficulty of these seas that it was not until 1820 that anyone went as far south as Antarctica.

===== North America =====
When the Spanish conquered Mexico in 1521, they gained a stretch of Pacific coast. In 1533, Fortún Ximénez reached Baja California and in 1539 Francisco de Ulloa showed that it was a peninsula, but the myth of an Island of California continued for many years. In 1542 Juan Rodriguez Cabrillo reached a point north of San Francisco. In 1578 Drake landed somewhere on the coast. In 1587 Pedro de Unamuno, coming from the Philippines, stopped at Morro Bay, California. In 1592, Juan de Fuca may have reached Puget Sound.

In 1595, Sebastian Rodriguez Cermeño (Sebastião Rodrigues Soromenho), commander of the Manila galleon San Agustín, attempted an exploration of the California coast. He reached the continent between Point St. George and Trinidad Head in California, but the galleon was later wrecked in a storm off Drake's Bay and the survivors had to sail the rest of the way back to Mexico in a small launch. The smaller vessel, however, allowed Cermeño to sail closer to the coast and to make useful observations of coastal features. In 1602, Sebastián Vizcaíno re-explored the California coast, one of his ships reaching Oregon. His was the last northward exploration for the next 150 years.

The Portolà expedition of 1769 began the land exploration of Alta California, following the coast as far north as San Francisco Bay and using the reports of Cermeño and Vizcaíno for guidance.

After conquering Mexico the Spanish occupied the southern two thirds of Mexico, all of Central America and the South American coast down to Chile. North of this the land was too dry to support a dense population that could be ruled and taxed. The only exception was the Pueblo peoples far to the north in New Mexico. People like Francisco Vásquez de Coronado penetrated far into the interior and found nothing that the Spanish valued. The Chichimeca country of northern Mexico was slowly absorbed and Baja California began to be settled in 1687. The returning Manila galleons followed the westerlies to the coast of California, but immediately turned south, making only a few attempts to explore the coast. For more see History of the West Coast of North America and Early knowledge of the Pacific Northwest.

===== Australia =====
Australia is remarkable for the number of explorers who missed it. Some think that the Portuguese reached Australia before 1600 but these theories are difficult to prove. The 1567–1606 Spanish voyages from South America stopped at islands to the east before reaching Australia. The first European to definitely see Australia was Willem Janszoon who in February 1606 reached the Cape York Peninsula and thought it was part of New Guinea. Also in 1606 (June to October) Luis Váez de Torres of the Quiros expedition from South America followed the south coast of New Guinea and passed through the Torres Strait without recognizing Australia. His voyage, and therefore the separation between Australia and New Guinea, was not generally known until 1765. From about 1611, the standard Dutch route to the East Indies was to follow the roaring forties as far east as possible and then turn sharply north to Batavia. Since it was difficult to know longitude, some ships would reach the west coast or be wrecked on it. In 1616, Dirk Hartog bumped into the west coast and did some exploring. Frederick de Houtman did the same in 1619. In 1623 Jan Carstenszoon followed the south coast of New Guinea, missed Torres Strait and went along the north coast of Australia. In 1643, Abel Tasman left Mauritius, missed Australia, found Tasmania, continued east and found New Zealand, missed the strait between the north and south islands, turned northwest, missed Australia again and sailed along the north coast of New Guinea. In 1644, he followed the south coast of New Guinea, missed the Torres Strait, turned south and mapped the north coast of Australia. In 1688, the English buccaneer William Dampier beached a ship on the northwest coast. In 1696, Willem de Vlamingh explored the southwest coast. In 1699, Dampier was sent to find the east coast of Australia. He sailed along the west coast, went north to Timor, followed the north coast of New Guinea to the Bismarck Archipelago and abandoned his search because his ship had become rotten. Until Captain Cook the east coast was completely unknown and New Zealand had only been seen once.

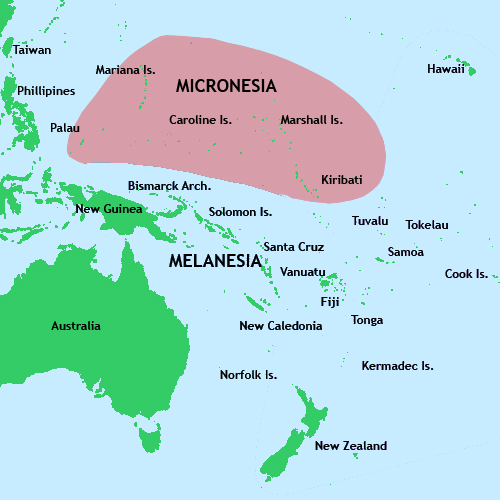
Major Islands. Off the map to the east of the Cook Islands are the Society Islands with Tahiti and then the Tuamoto Archipelago with the Marquesas to its north.

===== Pacific Islands =====
- 1521: Unfortunate Islands by Ferdinand Magellan, two atolls
- 1521: Thieves' Islands (Mariana Islands) also by the Portuguese Ferdinand Magellan, from Spain.
- 1525: Caroline Islands by Diogo da Rocha and Gomes de Sequeira, from the Portuguese East Indies (Moluccas).
- 1526: Islands of the Painted People (Marshall Islands) by Alonso de Salazar of the Loaísa expedition
- 1543: Bonin Islands by Bernardo de la Torre from Mexico
- 1568: Solomon Islands, the Ellice Islands (Tuvalu) and Wake Island by Álvaro de Mendaña de Neira from South America
- 1574: Juan Fernández Islands by Juan Fernández.
- 1595: Marquesas Islands and the Santa Cruz Islands by Álvaro de Mendaña de Neira from South America
- 1606: Tuamotu Archipelago, Butaritari and Makin (Gilbert Islands), the New Hebrides (Vanuatu) by Pedro Fernandes de Queirós from South America
- 1616: Friendly Islands (Niua Islands of Tonga) and the Bismarck Archipelago by Willem Schouten from Cape Horn.
- 1642: Van Diemen's Land (Tasmania), New Zealand, the southern Friendly Islands (Tonga), and the Cannibal Isles (Fiji) by Abel Tasman
- 1722: Easter Island and the Navigator Islands (Samoa) by Jacob Roggeveen from Cape Horn
- 1741: Aleutian Islands by Vitus Bering and Alexei Chirikov from Russia
- 1765: Tokelau and Nikunau by John Byron
- 1767: Tahiti by Samuel Wallis
- 1774: New Caledonia and Norfolk Island by James Cook
- 1777: Christmas Island (now Kiribati) by James Cook
- 1778: Sandwich Islands (Hawaii) by James Cook
- 1788: Gilbert Islands (now Kiribati) by Thomas Gilbert and John Marshall.
- 1791: Chatham Islands by William R. Broughton

===== Mythical lands =====
Europeans had long believed in a Strait of Anian somewhere near Bering Strait. A large and distorted Hokkaido was called 'Ezo', 'Jesso' and many other spellings. One of the Kuril Islands named "Companies Landt" by Vries grew into a large mass attached to North America. Joao-da-Gama-Land was thought to be east of Japan. There was an overgrown Puget Sound called "Grande Mer de l'Ouest" possibly connected to Hudson Bay. In the far south was a Terra Australis. The map published in Diderot's Encyclopédie in 1755 is filled with nonsense. In 1875 no less than 123 mythical islands were removed from the Royal Navy chart of the North Pacific.

==== Further expeditions ====
Russian posts closely followed the natural distribution of the fur-bearing Sea Otter

===== Alaska and the Russians =====
The modern period begins with Russian expeditions. They crossed Siberia and reached the Pacific in 1639 (Ivan Moskvitin). In 1644 Vassili Poyarkov found the Amur River. In 1648 Semyon Dezhnyov (probably) entered the Pacific from the Arctic Ocean. In 1652 Mikhail Stadukhin followed the coast of the Sea of Okhotsk. In 1697 Vladimir Atlasov entered the Kamchatka Peninsula overland from the north. In 1716 the first seagoing boats were built to reach Kamchatka from the mainland. In 1728 Vitus Bering sailed from Kamchatka through the strait that bears his name without seeing America. In 1732 Mikhail Gvozdev and Ivan Fedorov saw the tip of Alaska from the Bering Strait. In 1741 Vitus Bering and Alexei Chirikov sailed just south of the Aleutian Islands and reached the Alaska panhandle. Peter Kuzmich Krenitzin mapped the Aleutians before 1769. The myth of a land mass north of the Aleutians took a long time to dispel. Russians fur hunters island-hopped along the Aleutians and then along the south coast of Alaska looking mainly for sea otter (Attu at the west end of the Aleutians in 1745, Unalaska Island at the east end in 1759, Kodiak Island 1784, Kenai Peninsula 1785, Yakutat, 1795, Sitka 1799, Fort Ross 1812). North of the Aleutians posts appeared on the west coast after 1819. Spaniards from Mexico met the Russians in 1788. (see below). Russian America was sold to the United States in 1867.

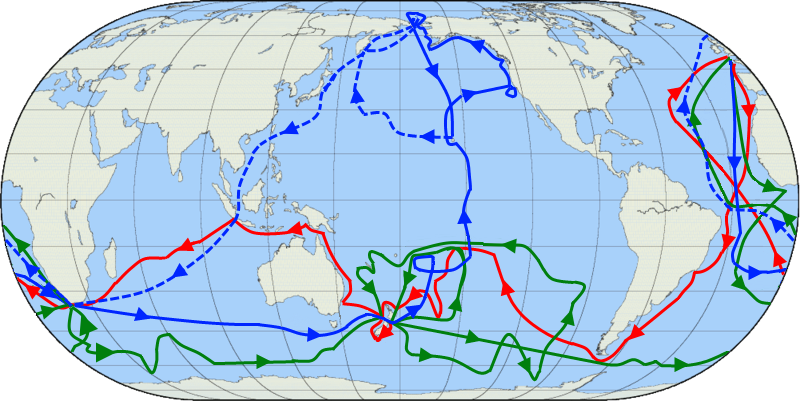
The routes of Captain James Cook's voyages. The first voyage is shown in red, second voyage in green, and third voyage in blue. The route of Cook's crew following his death is shown as a dashed blue line.

===== Captain Cook =====
On his first voyage (1768–1771) James Cook went to Tahiti from Cape Horn, circumnavigated New Zealand, followed the east coast of Australia for the first time and returned via the Torres Strait and the Cape of Good Hope. On his second voyage (1772–1775) he sailed from west to east keeping as far south as possible and showed that there was probably no Terra Australis. On his third voyage (1776–1780), he found the Hawaiian Islands (possibly first seen by Spanish captain Ruy López de Villalobos in 1542. The Spanish named these islands "Isla de Mesa, de los Monjes y Desgraciada") and followed the North American coast from Oregon to the Bering Strait, mapping this coast for the first time and showing that there was probably no Northwest Passage. Cook was killed in Hawaii in 1779. The expedition made a second attempt at the Bering Strait, stopped at Kamchatka and China and reached England in 1780. Cook set a high standard of scientific exploration, showed that there was no large land mass in the southern ocean, mapped the two largest island groups in the Pacific, and by following the east coast of Australia and the west coast of North America closed the last gaps in European knowledge of the Pacific coasts. On his second voyage, Cook was accompanied by Johann Reinhold Forster and Forster's son Georg, who influenced significantly Alexander von Humboldt and his understanding of the Pacific, which Humboldt encountered in 1802–3. Several German-speaking navigators and explorers followed, most of them in the service of expeditions launched by Imperial Russia. After Cook everything was detail.

===== Cook's rivals and successors =====
Several governments sponsored Pacific expeditions, often in rivalry or emulation of Captain Cook. At the time of Cook's first voyage, in 1766–1769, Louis Antoine de Bougainville crossed the Pacific and publicized Tahiti, in 1767 Samuel Wallis and Philip Carteret separately crossed the Pacific, and in 1769 Jean-François-Marie de Surville visited the Solomon Islands and New Zealand. In 1785–1788, Jean-François de Galaup, comte de Lapérouse followed the American coast from Chile to Alaska, crossed to China, explored northern Japan and Kamchatka, went south to Australia and lost his life in the Santa Cruz Islands. The Spanish Malaspina Expedition (1789–1794) visited the American coast, Manila, New Zealand and Australia. In 1792–1793 George Vancouver more thoroughly mapped the west coast of Canada. In 1803/6 Adam Johann von Krusenstern led the first Russian circumnavigation and investigated both sides of the North Pacific. In 1820 Fabian Gottlieb von Bellingshausen saw Antarctica. A number of other voyages are listed in "European and American voyages of scientific exploration."

===== Spain on the west coast of North America =====
For Europeans in the Age of Exploration western North America was one of the most distant places on Earth (9 to 12 months of sailing). Spain had long claimed the entire west coast of the Americas. The area north of Mexico however was given little attention in the early years. This changed when the Russians appeared in Alaska. The Spanish moved north to California and built a series of missions along the Pacific coast including: San Diego in 1767, Monterey, California in 1770 and San Francisco in 1776. San Francisco Bay was discovered in 1769 by Gaspar de Portolà from the landward side because its mouth is not obvious from the sea. The Spanish settlement of San Francisco remained the northern limit of land occupation. By sea, from 1774 to 1793 the Spanish expeditions to the Pacific Northwest tried to assert Spanish claims against the Russians and British. In 1774 Juan José Pérez Hernández reached what is now the south end of the Alaska panhandle. In 1778 Captain Cook sailed the west coast and spent a month at Nootka Sound on Vancouver Island. An expedition led by Juan Francisco de la Bodega y Quadra sailed north to Nootka and reached Prince William Sound. In 1788 Esteban José Martínez went north and met the Russians for the first time (Unalaska and Kodiak Island) and heard that the Russians were planning to occupy Nootka Sound. In 1789 Martinez went north to build a fort at Nootka and found British and American merchant ships already there. He seized a British ship which led to the Nootka Crisis and Spanish recognition of non-Spanish trade on the northwest coast. In 1791 the Malaspina expedition mapped the Alaska coast. In 1792 Dionisio Alcalá Galiano circumnavigated Vancouver Island. In 1792-93 George Vancouver also mapped the complex coast of British Columbia. Vancouver Island was originally named Quadra's and Vancouver's Island in commemoration of the friendly negotiations held by the Spanish commander of the Nootka Sound settlement, Juan Francisco de la Bodega y Quadra and British naval captain George Vancouver in Nootka Sound in 1792. In 1793 Alexander Mackenzie reached the Pacific overland from Canada. By this time Spain was becoming involved in the French wars and increasingly unable to assert its claims on the Pacific coast. In 1804 the Lewis and Clark Expedition reached the Pacific overland from the Mississippi River. By the Adams–Onís Treaty of 1819 Spain gave up its claims north of California. Canadian fur traders, and later a smaller number of Americans, crossed the mountains and built posts on the coast. In 1846 the Oregon Treaty divided the Oregon Country between Britain and the United States. The United States conquered California in 1848 and purchased Alaska in 1867.

===== Northeast =====
The Russians moved south and the Japanese moved north and explored the Kuril Islands and Sakhalin. About 1805 Adam Johann von Krusenstern was apparently the first Russian to reach eastern Siberia by sea from European Russia. In 1808 Mamiya Rinzo explored the coast of Sakhalin. During the Crimean War a British fleet failed to capture Petropavlovsk-Kamchatsky. In 1860 Russia annexed the southeast corner of Siberia from China.

===== The Pacific opened to trade and imperialism =====
After Captain Cook large numbers of European merchant vessels began to enter the Pacific. The reasons for this are not completely clear. On Cook's third voyage furs bought at Nootka were sold in China at a 1,800 percent profit - enough to pay for a trading voyage. The first to do this was James Hanna from Macao in 1785. Robert Gray in 1787 was the first American. This Maritime fur trade reached its peak about 1810, drew many ships into the Pacific and drew Canadians and Americans to the coast. The first Pacific whaling ship left London in 1788 and by the nineteenth century there were hundreds of whaleships in the Pacific each year. Clipper ships cut the sailing time from Europe to the Pacific. England founded a colony in Australia in 1788 and New Zealand in 1840. After about 1800 England began to replace the Dutch Republic along the Asian coast. Hong Kong became a colony in 1839 during the First Opium War, which was also the first time that a large European military and naval force appeared in the Pacific. European ships and sailors disrupted life on the Pacific islands. Most of the Pacific islands were soon claimed by one European power or another.

== See also ==
- Transpacific crossing
- Colonisation of Oceania
- Europeans in Oceania

== Bibliography ==
- Camino, Mercedes Maroto. Producing the Pacific: Maps and narratives of Spanish exploration (1567-1606) (Rodopi, 2005).
- Daum, Andreas. "German Naturalists in the Pacific around 1800: Entanglement, Autonomy, and a Transnational Culture of Expertise". In Explorations and Entanglements: Germans in Pacific Worlds from the Early Modern Period to World War I, ed. Hartmut Berghoff, Frank Biess, and Ulrike Strasser. New York: Berghahn Books, 2019, 79–102.
- Delaney, John. Strait Through: Magellan to Cook & the Pacific, (Princeton University Library, 2010). Website devoted to the exploration of the Pacific Ocean Online
- Dodge, Ernest Stanley. Beyond the Capes; Pacific Exploration from Captain Cook to the Challenger, 1776–1877 (Little, Brown, 1971).
- Engstrand, Iris HW. "Seekers of the 'Northern Mystery': European Exploration of California and the Pacific." California History 76.2-3 (1997): 78-110 online.
- Felipe Fernández-Armesto, Pathfinders - A Global History of Exploration, (2006).
- Guest, Harriet. Empire, Barbarism, and Civilisation: Captain Cook, William Hodges and the Return to the Pacific (Cambridge UP, 2007).
- Hayes, Derek. Historical Atlas of the North Pacific Ocean: Maps of Discovery and Scientific Exploration, 1500–2000, (2001)
- Haycox, Stephen, et al. eds. Enlightenment and Exploration in the North Pacific, 1741–1805. (U of Washington Press, 1997) excerpt.
- Heawood, Edward. A History Of Geographical Discovery in the Seventeenth And Eighteenth Centuries (1912) online
- Howse, Derek, ed. Background to Discovery: Pacific Exploration from Dampier to Cook (U of California Press, 1990).
- Irwin, Geoffrey. The prehistoric exploration and colonisation of the Pacific (Cambridge UP, 1994).
- Lincoln, Margarette, ed. Science and exploration in the Pacific: European voyages to the southern oceans in the eighteenth century (Boydell & Brewer, 2001).
- Lloyd, Christopher. Pacific Horizons: The Exploration of the Pacific Before Captain Cook (Allen and Unwin, 1946). online, popular history
- Lloyd, Christopher. Atlas of maritime history (1975) online, popular
- Parry, J.H. The Age of Reconnaissance (1963) online
- Williams, Glyn. "'To Make Discoveries of Countries Hitherto Unknown' The Admiralty and Pacific Exploration in the Eighteenth Century." The Mariner's Mirror 82.1 (1996): 14–27.
- Withey, Lynne. Voyages of discovery: Captain Cook and the exploration of the Pacific (U of California Press, 1989).

=== Historiography ===
- Davidson, James Wightman. "Problems of Pacific history." Journal of Pacific History 1#1 (1966): 5–21.
- Gulliver, Katrina. "Finding the Pacific world." Journal of World History 22#1 (2011): 83–100. online
- Igler, David (2013). The Great Ocean: Pacific Worlds from Captain Cook to the Gold Rush. New York: Oxford University Press. ISBN 978-0-19-991495-1.
- Munro, Doug. The Ivory Tower and Beyond: Participant Historians of the Pacific (Cambridge Scholars Publishing, 2009).
- Routledge, David. "Pacific history as seen from the Pacific Islands." Pacific Studies 8#2 (1985): 81+ online
- Samson, Jane. "Pacific/Oceanic History" in Kelly Boyd, ed. (1999). Encyclopedia of Historians and Historical Writing vol 2. Taylor & Francis. pp. 901–02. ISBN 978-1-884964-33-6.

=== Primary sources ===
- Lamb, Jonathan, Vanessa Smith, and Nicholas Thomas, eds. Exploration and exchange: A South Seas anthology, 1680-1900 (U of Chicago Press, 2000).
