= History of the Pacific Islands =

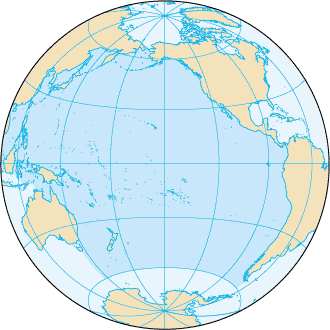
Map of the Pacific Ocean.

The history of the Pacific Islands covers the history of the islands in the Pacific Ocean.

== Histories ==
=== Cook Islands ===
In Cook Islands Māori pre-history, Chieftains from present day French Polynesia and their tribes, along with navigators, took their ships in search of unknown or newly found lands, first arriving in the southern island groups around 800 AD or earlier. Many other tribal migrations from French Polynesia, notably Tahiti would continue for centuries forming a unique Māori society. Similarly, the northern islands were also settled from the east, with some of the northern islands possibly having had later interactions with Western Polynesia. The capital Rarotonga, is known, from various oral histories to have been the launching site of seven waka ship voyagers who settled in New Zealand, becoming the major tribes of the New Zealand Māori. Up until relatively recently there was continuous contact between both lands where back and forth migration and trade took place. The Cook Islands Te Reo Māori language is closely related to the Te Reo Maori indigenous language of New Zealand. Spanish ships visited the islands in the 16th century; the first written record of contact with the islands came with the sighting of Pukapuka by Spanish sailor Álvaro de Mendaña de Neira in 1595 who called it San Bernardo (Saint Bernard). A few years later, a Spanish expedition led by Pedro Fernandes de Queirós made the first recorded European landing in the islands when he set foot on Rakahanga in 1606, calling it Gente Hermosa (Beautiful People). The country is named after British captain Captain James Cook who surveyed and landed on some of the islands between 1774 and 1777.

=== Easter Island ===
Easter Island is one of the youngest inhabited territories on earth, and for most of the history of Easter Island it was the most isolated inhabited territory on Earth. Its inhabitants, the Rapa Nui, have endured famines, epidemics, civil war, slave raids, and colonialism; have seen their population crash on more than one occasion.

=== Fiji ===
The history of Fiji dates back to ancient times. There are many theories as to how the Fijian race came into existence. Around 1500 BC Fiji was settled by Austronesian seafarers. Around 900–600 BC Moturiki Island was settled. By 500 BC, Melanesian seafarers had reached Fiji and intermarried with the Austronesian inhabitants, giving rise to the modern Fijian people. In 1643 AD, Abel Tasman sighted Vanua Levu Island and northern Taveuni. According to native oral legends Fijians were also descendants of a nomadic tribe from Tanganika (Tanzania).

=== Guam and the Northern Mariana Islands ===
The history of Guam involves phases including the early arrival of people known today as the ancient Chamorros, the development of "pre-contact" society, Spanish colonization, and the present American rule of the island. Archaeologists using carbon-dating have broken Pre-Contact Guam (i.e. Chamorro) history into three periods: "Pre-Latte" (BC 2000? to AD 1) "Transitional Pre-Latte" (AD 1 to AD 1000), and "Latte" (AD 1000 to AD 1521). Archaeological evidence also suggests that Chamorro society was on the verge of another transition phase by 1521, when Ferdinand Magellan's expedition arrived, as latte stones became bigger. The original inhabitants of Guam are believed to be descendants of Taiwanese indigenous peoples originating from the high mountains of Taiwan as early as 4,000 BC, having linguistic and cultural similarities to Malaysia, Indonesia, and the Philippines. Guam's history of colonialism is the longest among the Pacific islands and Chamorros are considered one of the oldest mixed race in the Pacific. In 1668 the Spanish formally incorporated the islands to the Spanish East Indies and founded a colony on Guam as a resting place for the west-bound Manila galleons. The territory was ceded by Spain more than two centuries later, when in 1898 the United States took over the islands following the Spanish–American War. The chamorro culture has evolved much since European contact and has been much influenced by Spanish and American colonization. Although the original culture no longer exists, it is now being revived with contemporary alternatives and similarities in styles with all the other pacific islands. Not one unique, but all combined to form a uniqueness in style, to today's modern interpretation of what their culture might have been. It should also be mentioned that the Chamorros on Guam view their culture & language differently than the Chamorros on the Northern Mariana Islands.

=== Hawaii ===
Hawaiian history is inextricably tied into a larger Polynesian phenomenon. Hawaiʻi is the northernmost vertex of the Polynesian Triangle, a region of the Pacific Ocean anchored by three island groups: Hawaiʻi, Rapa Nui (Easter Island), and Aotearoa (New Zealand). The many island cultures within the Polynesian Triangle share similar languages derived from a proto-Malayo-Polynesian language used in Southeast Asia 5,000 years ago. Polynesians also share cultural traditions, such as religion, social organization, myths, and material culture. Anthropologists believe that all Polynesians have descended from a South Pacific proto-culture created by an Austronesian (Malayo-Polynesian) people that had migrated from Southeast Asia. The seven main Polynesian cultures are Aotearoa, Hawaiʻi, Rapa Nui, Marquesas, Samoa, Tahiti, and Tonga.

The early settlement history of Hawaiʻi is a topic of continuing debate. Estimates for the date of first settlement of the Hawai'ian islands range from the 3rd century C.E. to between 940 and 1130 C.E.

=== Kiribati ===
In the history of Kiribati, the islands which now form the Republic of Kiribati have been inhabited for at least seven hundred years, and possibly much longer. The initial Micronesian population, which remains the overwhelming majority today, was visited by Polynesian and Melanesian invaders before the first European sailors "discovered" the islands in the 16th century. For much of the subsequent period, the main island chain, the Gilbert Islands, was ruled as part of the British Empire. The country gained its independence in 1979 and has since been known as Kiribati.

=== New Caledonia ===
In the history of New Caledonia, the diverse group of people that settled over the Melanesian archipelagos are known as the Lapita. They arrived in the archipelago now commonly known as New Caledonia and the Loyalty Islands around 1500 BC. The Lapita were highly skilled navigators and agriculturists with influence over a large area of the Pacific. From about the 11th century Polynesians also arrived and mixed with the populations of the archipelago. Europeans first sighted New Caledonia and the Loyalty Islands in the late 18th century. The British explorer James Cook sighted Grande Terre in 1774 and named it New Caledonia, Caledonia being the Latin name for Scotland. During the same voyage he also named the islands to the north of New Caledonia the New Hebrides (now Vanuatu), after the islands north of Scotland.

=== New Zealand ===
The History of New Zealand dates back to at least 700 years to when it was discovered and settled by Polynesians, who developed a distinct Māori culture centred on kinship links and land. The first European explorer, the Dutch Abel Tasman, came to New Zealand in 1642. From the late 18th century, the country was regularly visited by explorers and other sailors, missionaries, traders and adventurers. In 1840 the Treaty of Waitangi was signed between the British Crown and various Māori chiefs, bringing New Zealand into the British Empire and giving Māori equal rights with British citizens. There was extensive European and some Asian settlement throughout the rest of the century. War and the imposition of a European economic and legal system led to most of New Zealand's land passing from Māori to European ownership, and most Māori subsequently became impoverished.

From the 1890s the New Zealand parliament enacted a number of progressive initiatives, including women's suffrage and old age pensions. From the 1930s the economy was highly regulated and an extensive welfare state was developed. Meanwhile, Māori culture underwent a renaissance, and from the 1950s Māori began moving to the cities in large numbers. This led to the development of a Māori protest movement which in turn led to greater recognition of the Treaty of Waitangi in the late 20th century. In the 1980s the economy was largely deregulated and a number of socially liberal policies, such as decriminalisation of homosexuality, were put in place. Foreign policy, which had previously consisted mostly of following Britain or the United States, became more independent. Subsequent governments have generally maintained these policies, although tempering the free market ethos somewhat.

=== Niue ===
The history of Niue can be traced back to a 1,000 years when the Polynesian settles came here. Traces of Pukapulan dialect are still there in the native language which is based on the Samoan and Tongan language. The Polynesian settlers were rather isolated as there was very little inter island trade and the existence of the limestone island was in itself very difficult due to lack of rivers and cultivable soil.

The modern history of Niue can be traced back to 1774 with the arrival of Captain James Cook. Cook described the island as "Savage Island" in his records as the natives were not very welcoming to strangers. This was in complete contrast to the Tongans he described as "The Friendly Islands". Captain Cook tried to set his foot thrice on the island but was repulsed each of the three times. The natives at that time were quite hostile to strangers. Christianity was brought to the island by Peniamina in the year 1846 when he got converted during his stay at Samoa. The islanders were completely converted to Christianity by the end of the 19th century. Colonization took place thereafter and the island was declared as a part of the British Empire.

The island country became independent in 1974 but still have a free association agreement with New Zealand and many of its citizens have become citizens of New Zealand. Now the Island country has a democracy and is governed by a legislative assembly consisting of 20 members. Niue is the smallest democracy in the world.

=== Papua New Guinea ===
The History of Papua New Guinea can be traced back to about 60,000 years ago when people first migrated towards the Australian continent. The written history began when European navigators first sighted New Guinea in the early part of the 16th century. Portuguese explorers first arrived from the west and later Spanish navigators from the east, after crossing the Pacific. The island was given its name "New Guinea" by Spanish explorer Yñigo Ortiz de Retez who sailed its coast in 1545. Archaeological evidence indicates that humans arrived on New Guinea at least 60,000 years ago, probably by sea from Southeast Asia during an ice age period when the sea was lower and distances between islands shorter. For an overview of the geological history of the continent of which New Guinea is a part, see Australia – New Guinea. Although the first arrivals were hunter-gatherers, early evidence shows that people managed the forest environment to provide food. The gardens of the New Guinea highlands are ancient, intensive permacultures, adapted to high population densities, very high rainfalls (as high as 10,000mm/yr (400in/yr)), earthquakes, hilly land, and occasional frost. There are indications that gardening was being practised at the same time that agriculture was developing in Mesopotamia and Egypt.

=== Samoa ===
In the history of Samoa, contact with Europeans began in the early 18th century but did not intensify until the arrival of the English. In 1722, Dutchman Jacob Roggeveen was the first European to sight the islands. Missionaries and traders arrived in the 1830s. Halfway through the 19th century, the United Kingdom, Germany, and the United States all claimed parts of the kingdom of Samoa, and established trading posts. King Malietoa Leaupepe died in 1898 and was succeeded by Malietoa Tooa Mataafa. The US and British consuls supported Malietoa Tanu, Leaupepe's son. US and British warships, including the USS Philadelphia shelled Apia on 15 March 1899. After World War I, the League of Nations carved up Samoa. Britain and New Zealand took over the western islands which became 'Western Samoa' and USA claimed the eastern half of the country which became American Samoa. In 1962, Western Samoa became the first Pacific Island nation to gain political independence. In 1997, Samoa officially dropped the 'Western' from its name as it was an appendage from its colonial era.

=== Solomon Islands ===
The human history of the Solomon Islands begins with the first settlement at least 30,000 years ago from New Guinea. They represented the furthest expansion of humans into the Pacific Ocean until the expansion of Austronesian-language speakers through the area around 4000 BCE, bringing new agricultural and maritime technology. Most of the languages spoken today in the Solomon Islands derive from this era, but some thirty languages of the pre-Austronesian settlers survive (see East Papuan languages). The first European contact was that of Spanish explorer Álvaro de Mendaña de Neira whose expedition first sighted Santa Isabel island on 7 February 1568. Finding signs of alluvial gold on Guadalcanal, Mendaña believed he had found the source of King Solomon's wealth, and consequently named the islands "The Islands of Solomon". Many of the islands were also named by these explorers, including Guadalcanal, the Santa Cruz Islands, San Cristobal, Santa Ana and Santa Isabel. In 1595 and 1605 Spain again sent several expeditions to find the islands and establish a colony, though these were unsuccessful. In 1767 Captain Philip Carteret rediscovered Santa Cruz and Malaita. Later, Dutch, French and British navigators visited the islands; their reception was often hostile.

=== Tahiti ===
In the history of Tahiti, Tahiti is estimated to have been settled by Polynesians between CE 300 and 800 coming from Tonga and Samoa, although some estimates place the date earlier. The fertile island soil combined with fishing provided ample food for the population. Although the first European sighting of the islands was by a Spanish ship in 1606, Spain made no effort to trade with or colonize the island. Samuel Wallis, an English sea captain, sighted Tahiti on 18 June 1767, and is considered the first European visitor to the island. The perceived relaxation and contented nature of the local people and the characterization of the island as a paradise much impressed early European visitors, planting the seed for a romanticization by the West that endures to this day.

=== Tokelau ===
Archaeological evidence indicates that history of Tokelau's atol—Atafu, Nukunonu, and Fakaofo—were settled about 1,000 years ago, probably by voyages from Samoa, the Cook Islands and Tuvalu. Oral history traces local traditions and genealogies back several hundred years. Inhabitants followed Polynesian mythology with the local god Tui Tokelau; and developed forms of music (see Music of Tokelau) and art. The three atolls functioned largely independently while maintaining social and linguistic cohesion. Tokelauan society was governed by chiefly clans, and there were occasional inter-atoll skirmishes and wars as well as inter-marriage. Fakaofo, the "chiefly island," held some dominance over Atafu and Nukunonu. Life on the atolls was subsistence-based, with reliance on fish and coconut. Commodore John Byron discovered Atafu on 24 June 1765 and named it "Duke of York's Island." Parties onshore reported that there were no signs of current or previous inhabitants.

=== Tonga ===
The history of Tonga stretches back to around roughly 450 AD, when the Polynesians arrived. Tonga became known as the Tongan Empire through extensive trading and its influence and show of strength and domination over parts of the Pacific (e.g. Samoa, Fiji). The Europeans arrived in the 17th century which was followed after a couple hundred years by a single unified Tongan kingdom. Archaeological evidence shows that the first settlers in Tonga sailed from the Santa Cruz Islands, as part of the original Austronesian-speakers' (Lapita) migration which originated out of southeast Asia some 6,000 years before present. Archaeological dating places Tonga as the oldest known site in Polynesia for the distinctive Lapita ceramic ware, at 2800–2750 years before present.

=== Tuvalu ===
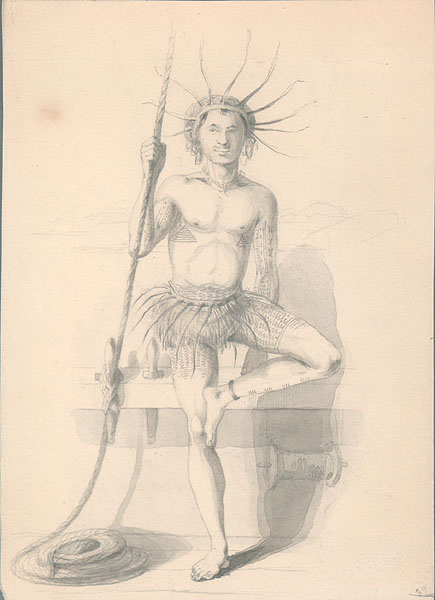
Tuvaluan man in traditional costume drawn by Alfred Agate in 1841 during the United States Exploring Expedition.

The history of Tuvalu dates back to at least 1,000 years to when it was discovered and settled by Polynesians. the origins of the people of Tuvalu is addressed in the theories regarding the spread of humans out of Southeast Asia, from Taiwan, via Melanesia and across the Pacific islands to create Polynesia.

During pre-European-contact times there was frequent canoe voyaging between the islands as Polynesian navigation skills are recognised to have allowed deliberate journeys on double-hull sailing canoes or outrigger canoes. Eight of the nine islands of Tuvalu were inhabited; thus the name, Tuvalu, means "eight standing together" in Tuvaluan. The pattern of settlement that is believed to have occurred is that the Polynesians spread out from the Samoan Islands into the Tuvaluan atolls, with Tuvalu providing a stepping stone to migration into the Polynesian Outlier communities in Melanesia and Micronesia.

In 1568, Spanish navigator Álvaro de Mendaña was the first European to sail through the islands and sighted Nui during his expedition in search of Terra Australis. European explorers did not return until two centuries later. In 1819 the island of Funafuti was named Ellice's Island; the name Ellice was applied to all nine islands after the work of English hydrographer Alexander George Findlay (1812–1876). The islands came under Britain's sphere of influence in the late 19th century, when each of the Ellice Islands was declared a British protectorate by Captain Gibson R.N., of HMS Curacoa, between 9 and 16 October 1892. The Ellice Islands were administered as a British protectorate by a resident commissioner from 1892 to 1916 and later as part of the Gilbert and Ellice Islands colony from 1916 to 1974.

A referendum was held in December 1974 to determine whether the Gilbert Islands and Ellice Islands should each have their own administration. As a consequence of the referendum, the Gilbert and Ellice Islands colony ceased to exist on 1 January 1976 and the separate British colonies of Kiribati and Tuvalu came into existence. Tuvalu became fully independent within the Commonwealth on 1 October 1978. On 17 September 2000 Tuvalu became the 189th member of the United Nations.

=== Vanuatu ===
In the history of Vanuatu, the commonly held theory of Vanuatu's prehistory from archaeological evidence supports that peoples speaking Austronesian languages first came to the islands some 3,000 to 3,500 years ago. Pottery fragments have been found dating back to 1300 BC What little is known of the pre-European contact history of Vanuatu has been gleaned from oral histories and legends. One important early king was Roy Mata, who united several tribes, and was buried in a large mound with several retainers. The first European contact with Vanuatu came in 1606, when a Spanish expedition led by the Portuguese explorer Pedro Fernández de Quirós discovered Espiritu Santo, naming it Australia del Espiritu Santo, believing he had arrived in the southern continent. Europeans did not return until 1768, when Louis Antoine de Bougainville rediscovered the islands.

=== Other islands ===
The history of American Samoa begins with inhabitation as early as 1000 BC, Samoa was not reached by European explorers until the 18th century.

The history of Baker Island began when the United States of America took possession of the island in 1857, and its guano deposits were mined by U.S. and British companies during the second half of the 19th century. In 1935, a short-lived attempt at colonization was begun on this island – as well as on nearby Howland Island – but was disrupted by World War II and thereafter abandoned. Presently the island is a National Wildlife Refuge run by the U.S. Department of the Interior; a day beacon is situated near the middle of the west coast.

Westerners arrived in Caroline Islands in 1525, by the Portuguese Diogo da Rocha and his pilot Gomes de Sequeira, naming them the Sequeira Islands. At about the same time, in 1526, they were sighted by the Spanish Toribio Alonso de Salazar, he called them "Carolinas" after Holy Roman Emperor Charles V. Though early Spanish navigators in the area (from 1543) called them the Nuevas Filipinas ("New Philippines"), Admiral Francisco Lazeano named them the Carolinas after King Charles II of Spain in 1686.

In the history of French Polynesia, the French Polynesian island groups do not share a common history before the establishment of the French protectorate in 1889. The first French Polynesian islands to be settled by Polynesians were the Marquesas Islands in AD 300 and the Society Islands in AD 800. The Polynesians were organized in petty chieftainships.

Historical evidence suggests that Howland Island was the site of prehistoric settlement, which may have extended down to Rawaki, Canton, Manra, and Orona of the Phoenix Islands 500 to 700 km southeast. This settlement might have taken the form of a single community utilising several adjacent islands, but the hard life on these isolated islands, together with the uncertainty of fresh water supplies, led to an extinction of or dereliction by the settled peoples, in such a way that other islands in the area (such as Kiritimati and Pitcairn) were abandoned. Such settlements probably began around 1000 BC, when eastern Melanesians traveled north.

The history of Jarvis Island begins with the island's first known sighting by Europeans was on 21 August 1821 by the British ship Eliza Francis (or Eliza Frances) owned by Edward, Thomas, and William Jarvis and commanded by Captain Brown. In March 1857 the uninhabited island was claimed for the United States under the Guano Islands Act and formally annexed on 27 February 1858.

In the history of Marquesas Islands, the first recorded settlers of the Marquesas were Polynesians, who, from archеological evidence, are believed to have arrived before 100 AD. Ethnological and linguistic evidence suggests that they likely arrived from the region of Tonga and Samoa. The islands were given their name by the Spanish explorer Álvaro de Mendaña de Neira who reached them on 21 July 1595. He named them after his patron, García Hurtado de Mendoza, 5th Marquis of Cañete, who was Viceroy of Peru at the time. Mendaña visited first Fatu Hiva and then Tahuata before continuing on to the Solomon Islands.

In the history of Melanesia, the original inhabitants of the islands now named Melanesia were likely the ancestors of the present day Papuan-speaking people. These people are thought to have occupied New Guinea tens of millennia ago and reached the islands 35,000 years ago (according to radiocarbon dating). They appear to have occupied these islands as far east as the main islands in the Solomon Islands (i.e., including San Cristobal) and perhaps even to the smaller islands farther to the east.

The ancestors of the so-called "Micronesians" in the history of Micronesia settled there over 4,000 years ago. A decentralized chieftain-based system eventually evolved into a more centralized economic and religious empire centred on Yap. European explorers – first the Portuguese in search of the Spice Islands (Indonesia) and then the Spaniards – reached the Carolines in the 16th century, with Spain establishing sovereignty.

Researchers of the history of the Marshall Islands agree on little more than that successive waves of migratory peoples from Southeast Asia spread across the Western Pacific about 3,000 years ago, and that some of them landed on and remained on these islands. The Spanish explorer Alonso de Salazar landed there in 1529. They were named for English explorer John Marshall, who visited them in 1799. The Marshall Islands were claimed by Spain in 1874. Following papal mediation and German compensation of $4.5 million, Spain recognised Germany's claim in 1885, which established a protectorate and set up trading stations on the islands of Jaluit and Ebon to carry out the flourishing copra (dried coconut meat) trade. Marshallese Iroij (high chiefs) continued to rule under indirect colonial German administration.

In the history of the Society Islands, the archipelago is generally believed to have been named by Captain James Cook in honour of the Royal Society, sponsor of the first British scientific survey of the islands; however, Cook states in his journal that he called the islands Society "as they lay contiguous to one another".

In the history of Tuamotu, the Tuamotus were first discovered by a Spanish expedition led by Ferdinand Magellan in 1521. From the Inca Empire, Tupac Inca Yupanqui is also credited with leading a nearly 10-month voyage of exploration into the Pacific around 1480. None of these visits were of political consequence, the islands being in the sphere of influence of the Pomare dynasty of Tahiti. At the beginning 18th century, the first Christian missionaries arrived. The islands' pearls penetrated the European market in the late 19th century, making them a coveted possession. Following the forced abdication of King Pomare V of Tahiti, the islands were annexed as an overseas territory of France.

== See also ==
- Europeans in Oceania
- Exploration of the Pacific
- List of countries and islands by first human settlement
- Pacific Islands
