= Francisco Gali =

Spanish sailor and cartographer

Francisco Gali (1539 in Seville – 1586 in Manila) was a Spanish sailor and cartographer, active in the second half of the 16th century across the Pacific Ocean and in New Spain and Spanish East Indies, particularly Philippines. He is best known for his three trans-Pacific crossings on the Manila galleon trade route: Acapulco to Manila in 1583, Macau to Acapulco in 1584 and in 1585 again Acapulco to Manila, where he died. At least the last trip was by order of the Spanish viceroy of New Spain, Pedro Moya de Contreras.

From 1582 until his death in 1586, Gali plied the Manila galleon route which had been established in 1565, initially as a navigator. On his return voyage to Acapulco from Macau in 1584, Gali navigated the ship he was in to a high latitude, which brought the ship along the North American coast; here, he believed to have found evidence of the Strait of Anián, a then supposed northwest passage and boundary between Asia and the Americas. According to Fernandez de Navarrete's account of the voyage, Gali sailed three hundred leagues east and northeast of Japan where currents took him to the northern coast of New Spain where he no longer encountered the currents or ocean depth he encountered before; he theorized that the strait was in the region of the strong currents. Gali also made one of the earliest European documentations of the coast of the Alta California coast during this return voyage. He reached the coast under latitude 37°30'N, at Pillar Point and described the land southward as "a very high and fair land with many trees, wholly without snow." He also noted "a great store of seals" which he took as an indication of the presence of many rivers, bays and havens along the coast. His account makes a reference to Cape Mendocino, found by Bartolomé Ferrer in 1543, despite not having reached it himself; this indicates that other Spanish ships had previously passed along the Alta California coast as far north as the cape.

For reasons unknown, Gali's report on the Macau-Acapulco journey fell into the hands of Jan Huygen van Linschoten who included that information in his Itinerario (1596).

Gali's account of the Alta California coast caught the attention of the viceroy and archbishop of New Spain, Pedro Moya de Contreras. There was interest in establishing a settlement in California to serve as a way-station for the Manila galleons and as a base for further explorations into North America; concern over potential encroachment from other colonial powers may have also motivated Contreras. In 1585, Contreras assigned Gali a mission to survey the coasts of Japan, the purported islands of the Anson Archipelago and the coast of California, with orders to avoid China. Gali was furnished with the San Juan, piloted by Alonso Gomez, and ten thousand pesos and sailed with the San Martin on March 25. Gali was unable to complete Contreras's mission as he died in Manila, leaving the mission to his second in command, Pedro de Unamuno.

== See also ==
- Pedro de Unamuno
- João da Gama

== Sources ==
- Inglis, Robin (2008). Historical Dictionary of the Discovery and Exploration of the Northwest Coast of America ISBN 978-0-8108-5551-9
- Spate, Oskar Hermann Khristian (2004), The Spanish Lake, Australian National University, ISBN 1-920942-16-5.
- Morato-Moreno, Manuel (2017). The Map of Tlacotalpa by Francisco Gali, 1580: An Early Example of a Local Coastal Chart in Spanish America
