= Ganges Island =

Phantom island in the North Pacific

Native name: 中ノ鳥島
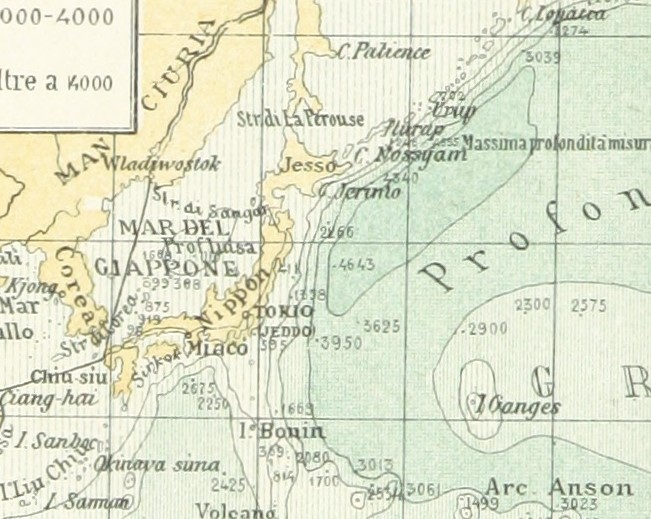
- Enlarged map accompanying the book The Earth, popular treatise on universal geography written in Italy in 1898. The words I(sola) Ganges are written in the lower right corner.

Geography
- Location: Pacific Ocean
- Archipelago: Ogasawara Islands
- Area: 2.13 km^{2} (0.82 sq mi)
- Coastline: 6.67 km (4.145 mi)

Administration
- Japan?
- Prefecture: Tokyo Prefecture
- Subprefecture: Ogasawara Subprefecture

Additional information
- A phantom island that was recognized as Japanese territory from 1908 to 1943, but does not actually exist. Data on the island when it was recognized as a territory is provided.

Ganges Island, a phantom island known as Nakanotorishima (中ノ鳥島 or 中鳥島; literally "central bird island") in Japanese, appeared at on maps of the late 19th and early 20th centuries. Reports of its disappearance appeared in 1933.

The purported island was considered a part of an Anson Archipelago, which included other phantom islands such as Los Jardines as well as real islands such as Wake and Marcus Islands.

== History ==
=== Discovery by Americans ===
Ganges Island is probably named after the ship Ganges, a Nantucket whaler active in the Pacific between 1815 and 1851, which discovered several islands in the Pacific. The discovery may have taken place during one of the ship's first three campaigns: August 1815 to October 1817 (Captain Isaiah Ray), June 1818 to June 1821 (Captain Isaiah Ray) or August 1821 to March 1824 (Captain Joshua Coffin).

Ganges Island is referenced in 1826 on Bowditch's American Practical Navigator at position: 30°45′N 154°25′E, then on a map of 1832. In 1841, Jeremiah N. Reynolds attributed the same position to Ganges Island, noting a nearby island: 31°N 155°E, which he believed to be the same island., but also another position of nearby Ganges Island 31°00′N 154°10′E. Similarly, Alexander George Findlay's book lists two sightings at 31°30′N 154°0′E and 31°30′N 163°0′E as being the same as the "Ganges Reef" at 30°47′N 154°20′E, itself presented as "doubtful."

From its first mention in 1826, Ganges Island remained in Bowditch's American Practical Navigator until 1880, but disappeared in 1888. In 1875, a major revision of the U.S. Admiralty removed many dubious islands, including Ganges Island, from the charts, but continued to record various reefs in the area until 1941.

=== Rediscovery by Japanese ===
The Japanese government also had this information. The Japan Hydrographic Magazine in 1904 by the then Japanese Ministry of the Navy Hydrographic Department also states that;

Ogasawara Islanders have explored it several times in the past but failed to find it. It is listed on nautical charts as P.D. (Position Doubtful.) Its presence or absence has not yet been determined, so voyagers should exercise extreme caution.

The coordinates of Ganges Island, 30°47′N 154°15′E, 30°47′N 154°16′E, etc. were then marked.

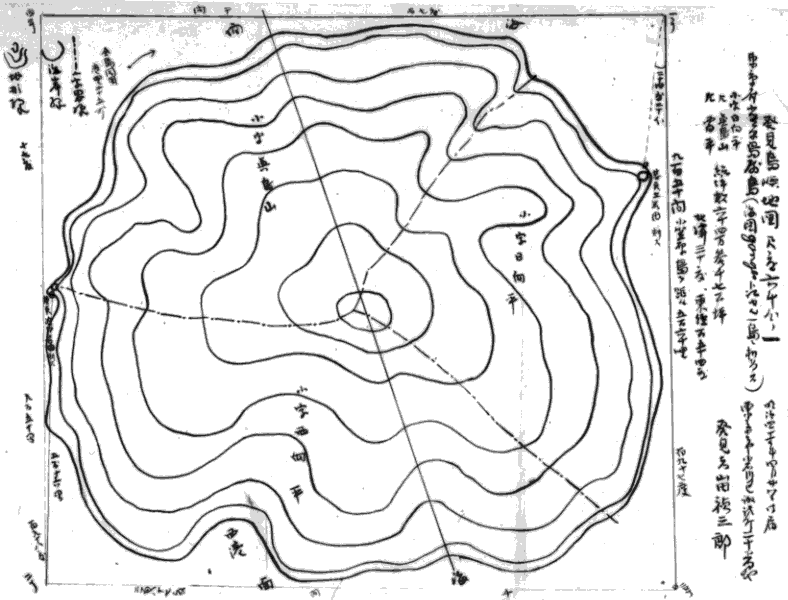
Teizaburo Yamada reported Ganges Island

In August 1907, Teizaburo Yamada of Tokyo City reported that he had discovered Islands 560 Nautical miles from Ogasawara Islands, and had explored and surveyed. The report was submitted to the Ogasawara Subprefecture on April 28, 1908, in which Yamada compared the island he had discovered to "Ganges Island" and submitted it with a "Notification of Discovery of Islands Belonging to Ogasawara Island" and a map of the island.

According to the " Notification of Discovery of Islands Belonging to Ogasawara Island ", the island was located at 30°05′N 154°02′E. The island has a circumference of 1ri 25 cho (about 6.67 km), an area of 643,700 tsubo (about 2.13 km^{2}), and some vegetation, which appeared to be coral reefs. The island was also covered with phosphorite, which is formed when guano accumulates, and was considered important at the time as a gunpowder material and fertilizer.

Yamada's report of the discovery contains a number of oddities, including the fact that the location of the island does not correspond to the distance from the island to the Ogasawara Islands, and that there were several million albatrosses there even though albatross did not fly there at that time of year.

Based on Yamada's report, Hiroshi Abe, the Governor of Tokyo Prefecture, submitted a "Report on the New Island Administrative District Allocation" to the Minister of Home Affairs, Takashi Hara, along with a "Notification of the Discovery of Islands Belonging to Ogasawara Island".

On July 22, 1908, Named "Nakanotori Island" and incorporated into Japanese territory by Japanese Cabinet decision. According to the minutes of the Cabinet meeting, the island discovered by Yamada was reported to correspond to "Ganges Island" on the nautical charts, but since it was different from the location of Ganges Island in Japan Hydrographic Magazine, it was necessary to determine the location at a later date, saying "There is a slight difference in its location, and it is necessary to determine it on another day." However, it was also stated that "there is no argument that it belongs to Japanese territory."

=== Failure of large-scale surveys ===
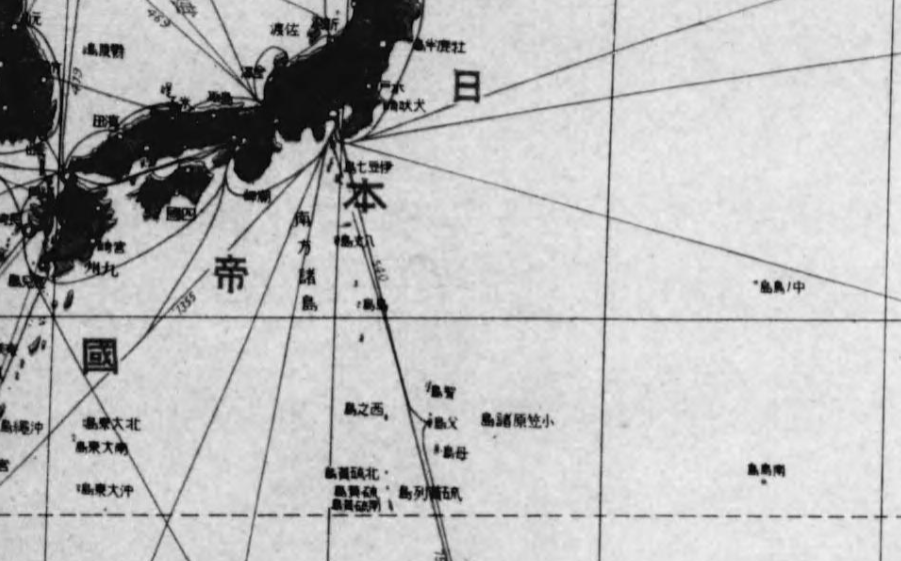
Nakanotorishima (島鳥ノ中) on a 1941 map of Japan (center right)

However, Nakanotori Island has not been found again since. Especially in the Taisho era (1912–1926), the surrounding waters were explored on a large scale, but no discovery was made at all. In 1913, the "Yoshioka Maru" went to survey Nakanotori Island, but failed to find the island.

In September 1927, a survey was conducted by the Aviso "Manshu", but the island was not found. Thus, it was removed from the Japanese Navy's classified hydrographic charts by the Naval Hydrographic Notification of 1943, along with Ganges Reef, as it was implicitly not real.

=== After WWII ===
On January 29, 1946, after World War II, the General Headquarters of the Allied Powers issued Instruction No. 677 on the scope of "Japan." Although it stated that this "means the extent of Japan for the purpose of this Instruction and does not indicate the extent of Japanese territory," the following list, including "Nakanotori-shimaNakanotorishima" was presented.

(a)Ulleungdo, Liancourt Rocks, Jeju Island; (b) All other islands of the Outer Pacific, including Ryukyu Islands south of 30 degrees north latitude (include Kuchinoshima), Izu Islands, South Seas Mandate, Ogasawara, Iwo Islands, Daitō Islands, Okinotorishima, Minamitorishima, Nakanotorishima; (c) Kuril Islands, Habomai Islands (include Tanfiliev Island, Yuri, Anuchina, Zelyony Island, Polonsky Island), Shikotan.

On November 22, 1946, Japanese Ministry of Transport's Hydrographic Department issued Notice No. 46, stating that "The reefs suspected to be located approximately 14 nautical miles north of Nakanotorishima Island and the island were found not to exist as a result of a precise survey" and were deleted from general hydrographic publications.

Although the description of Nakanotori Island was deleted sequentially in accordance with the public notice, unamended hydrographic charts and maps were still circulated in the private sector, such as those depicted in the "Koutou Shinchizu" (高等新地図) published in 1953.

At a House of Councilors General Affairs Committee meeting on April 7, 1998, Chief Cabinet Secretary Kenzo Muraoka responded to a question about Nakanotorishima:

In July 1908, the Cabinet made a decision to "name the island Nakanotorishima and to place it under the jurisdiction of the Ogasawara Islands Agency in Tokyo Prefecture." In 1943, "it was deleted from the Confidential Hydrographic Chart" and in 1946, "Nakanotorishima does not exist," " Detailed observations have shown that it does not exist." Therefore, the existence of Nakanotorishima is not currently confirmed.

Maps showing Ganges Island
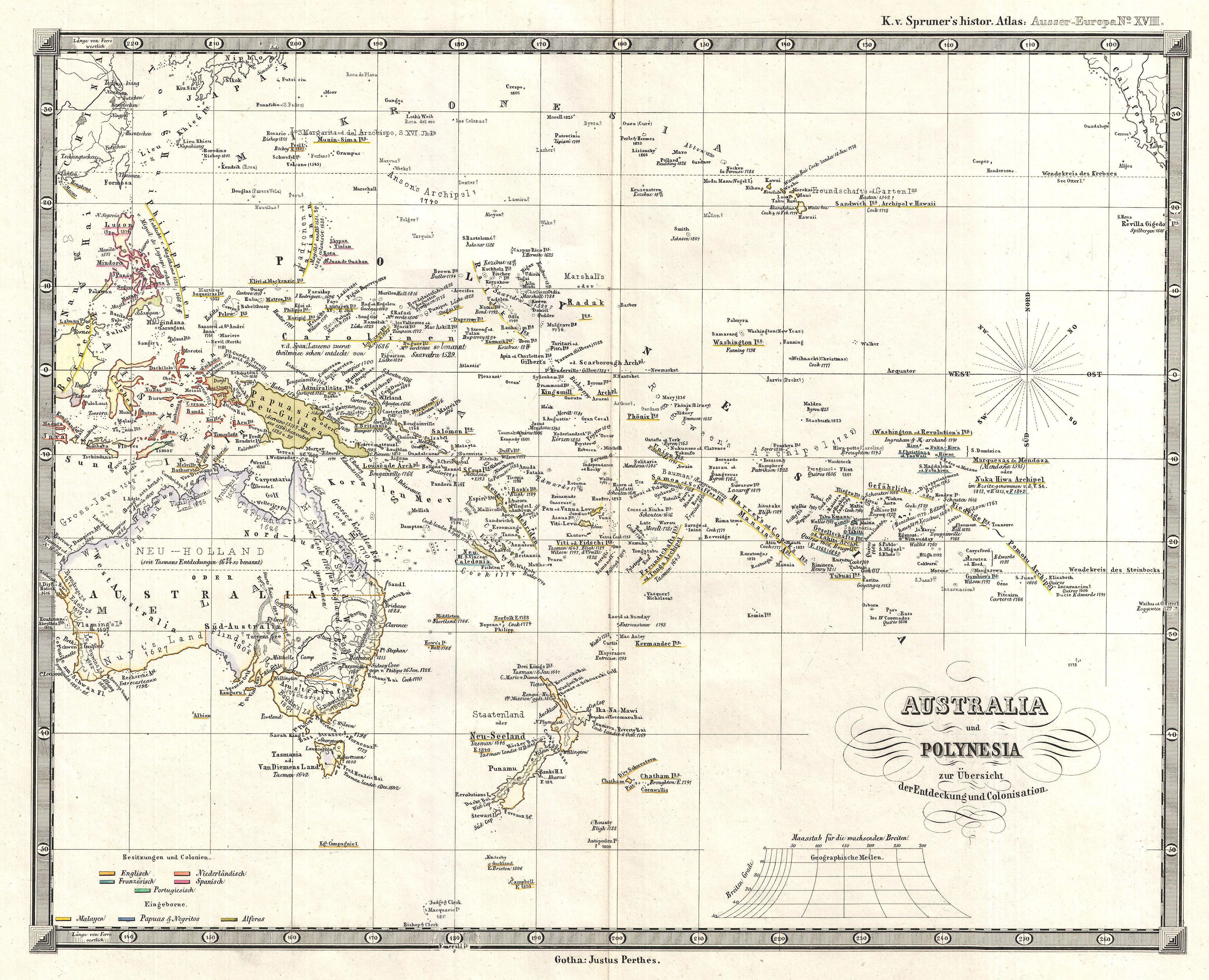
An 1855 German map showing Ganges Island east of the Bonin Islands ("Munin-Sima")

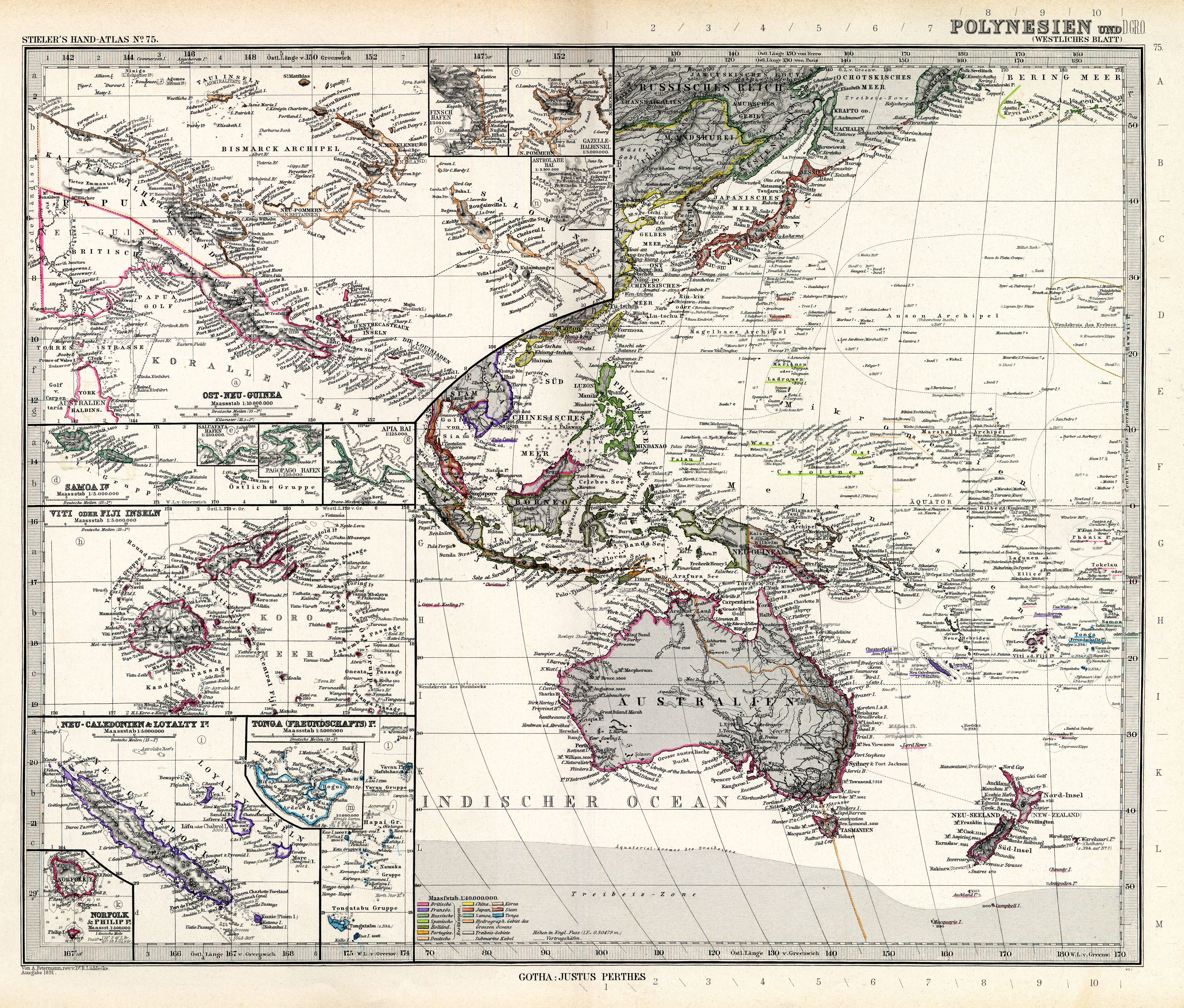
An 1891 German map showing Ganges Island in the Anson Archipelago, east of the Bonin Islands

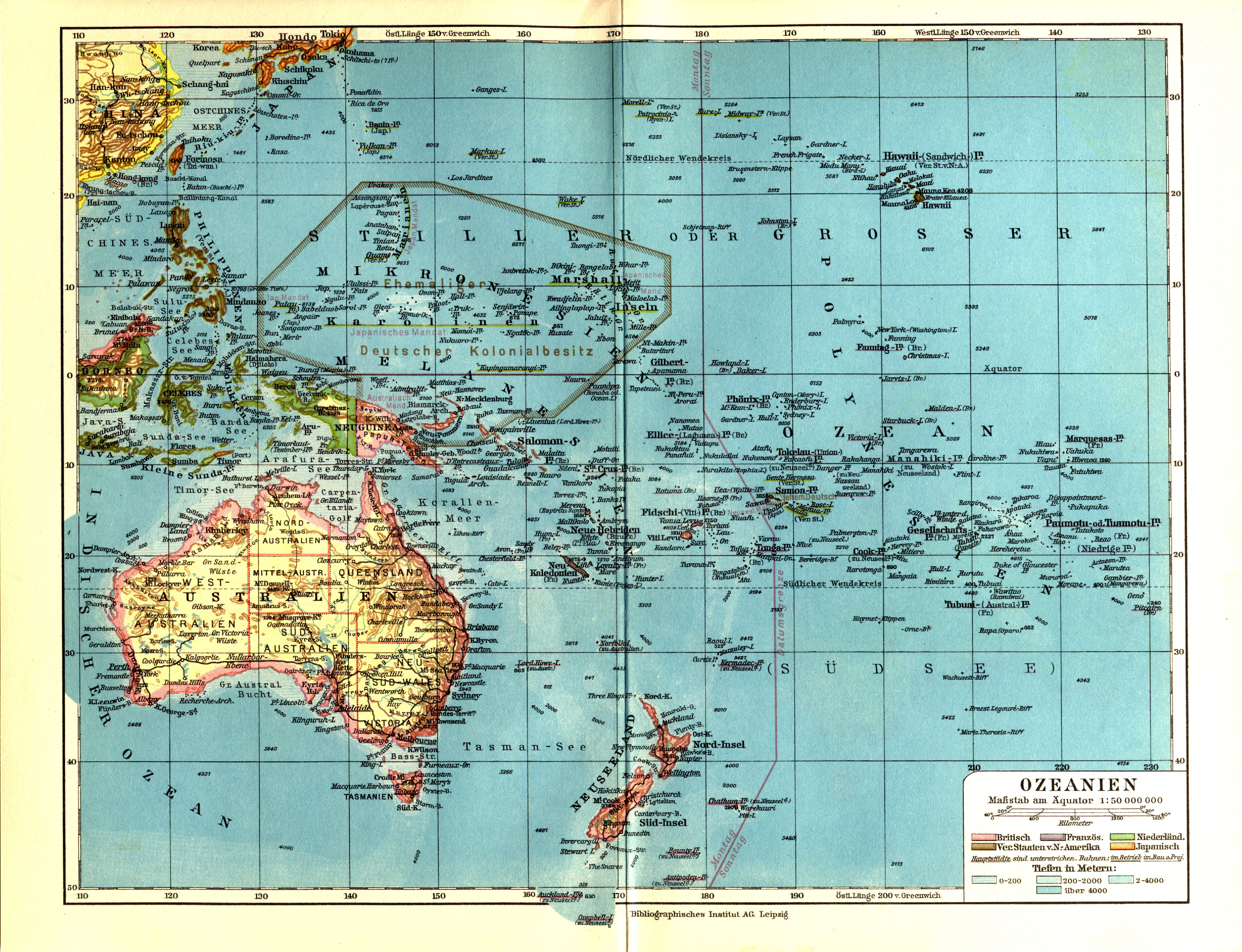
A 1932 German map showing Ganges Island east of the Bonin Islands

== See also ==
- Minamitorishima, literally "southern bird island"
- Okinotorishima, literally "distant bird island"
- Phantom island
