= Pedro de Unamuno =

Spanish soldier and explorer

Pedro de Unamuno was a Spanish soldier and sailor who was active in New Spain and the Spanish East Indies, particularly the Philippines, in the second half of the 16th century. He is known for commanding the galleon Nuestra Señora de la Esperanza, that in the year 1587 undertook the second trans-Pacific crossing from the Asian mainland to the Americas in history, the first being the one achieved by his contemporary Francisco Gali in 1584.

== Trans-Pacific journey ==
The voyage started in Macau on 12 July 1587 and reached the Californian shore on October 18, at 35.5 degrees North latitude, where they went on shore in a bay with sandy beaches (potentially Monterey Bay or Morro Bay) and made contact with some indigenous Californians. They then sailed progressively southwards along the Western American coast to Acapulco, reaching the area on November 22 of same year.

The main goals of the journey were to find the purported islands of Rica de Oro, Rica de Plata and Armenio (which Unamuno concluded did not exist), and also the profitable transport of Chinese goods to New Spain (which was a violation, like Gali's voyage three years earlier, of the monopoly accorded by the Spanish Crown to the Manila galleons). The official trade galleon of 1587 from Manila, the Santa Ana, reached the Californian coast one month later than the Esperanza but was then captured along with her cargo by two English privateer ships commanded by Sir Thomas Cavendish.

Unamuno had Alonso Gómez as pilot, a crew of Spaniards and Philippine Indios, and three Franciscan friars as passengers, namely Martín Ignacio de Loyola, Francisco de Nogueira, and a third one whose name is unknown. De Loyola brought along with him a young Japanese converted to Catholicism.

== See also ==
- João da Gama
