= Los Jardines =

Phantom islands in the Pacific Ocean

Coordinates: 21°40′N 151°35′E

Los Jardines or Los Buenos Jardines (Spanish for "the good gardens") are phantom islands supposedly located northeast of the Mariana Islands.

The islands were reportedly visited by Spanish explorers Álvaro de Saavedra Cerón (who named them Los Buenos Jardines) in 1528 and Ruy López de Villalobos (who called them Los Jardines) in 1542. Sighted again by John Marshall in 1788, they were purported to be part of an Anson Archipelago, which included other phantom islands such as Ganges Island as well as real islands such as Wake and Marcus Islands. In 1973, the International Hydrographic Organization removed them from its charts.

Maps showing Los Jardines
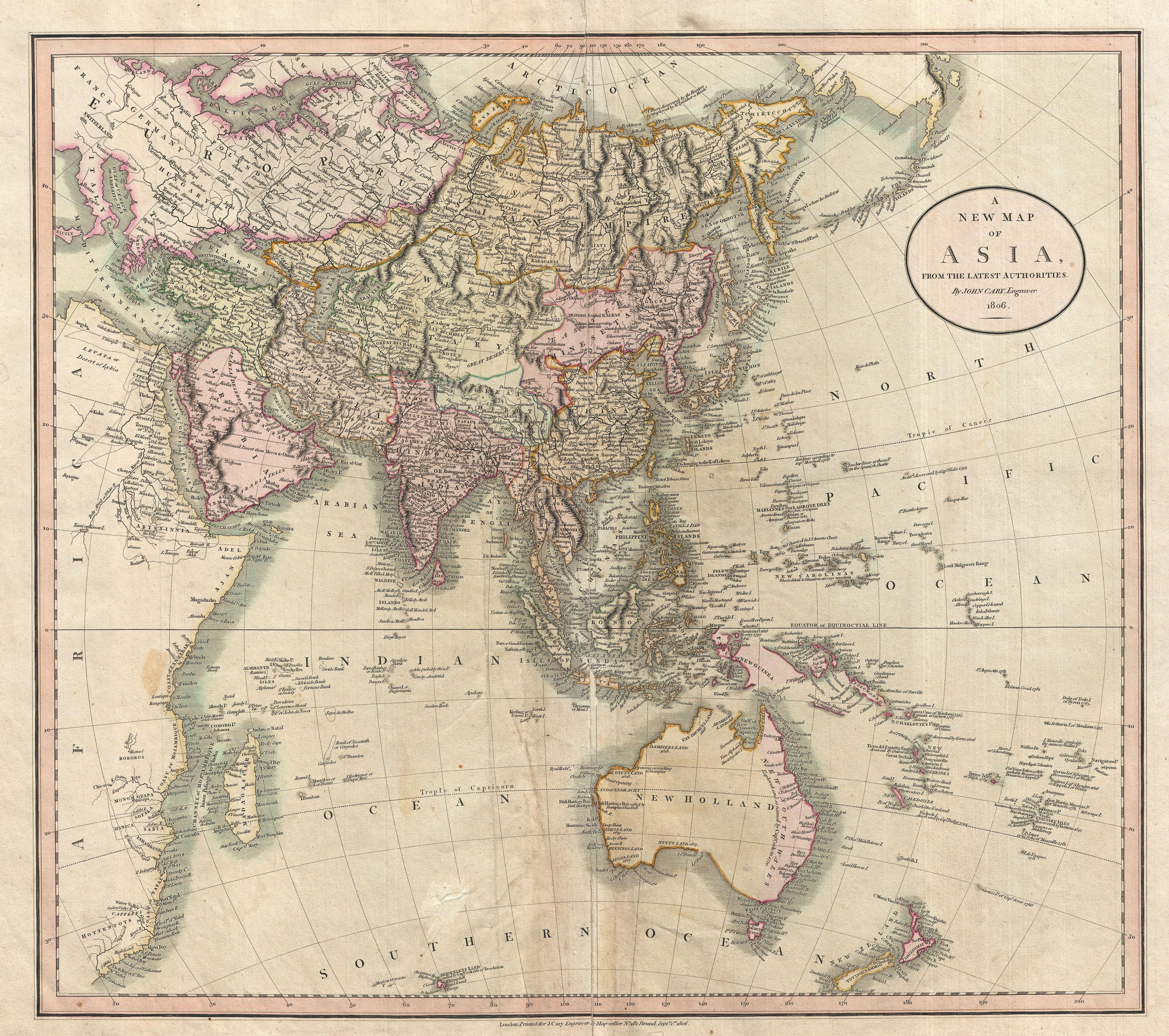
An 1806 British map showing two possible locations of (Los) Jardines northeast of the Mariana Islands

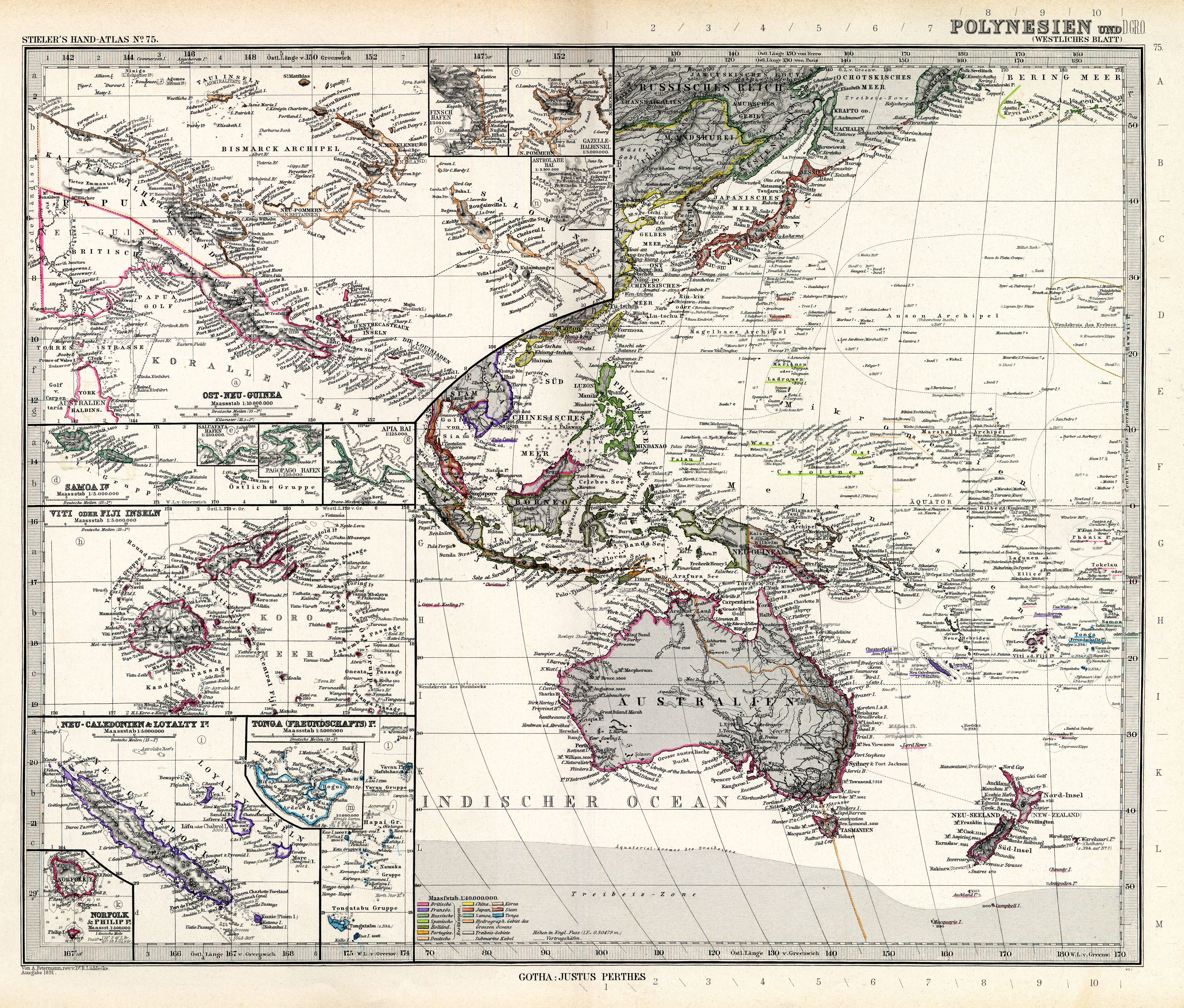
An 1891 German map showing Los Jardines (Marshall) in the Anson Archipelago, northeast of the Mariana Islands and northwest of the Marshall Islands

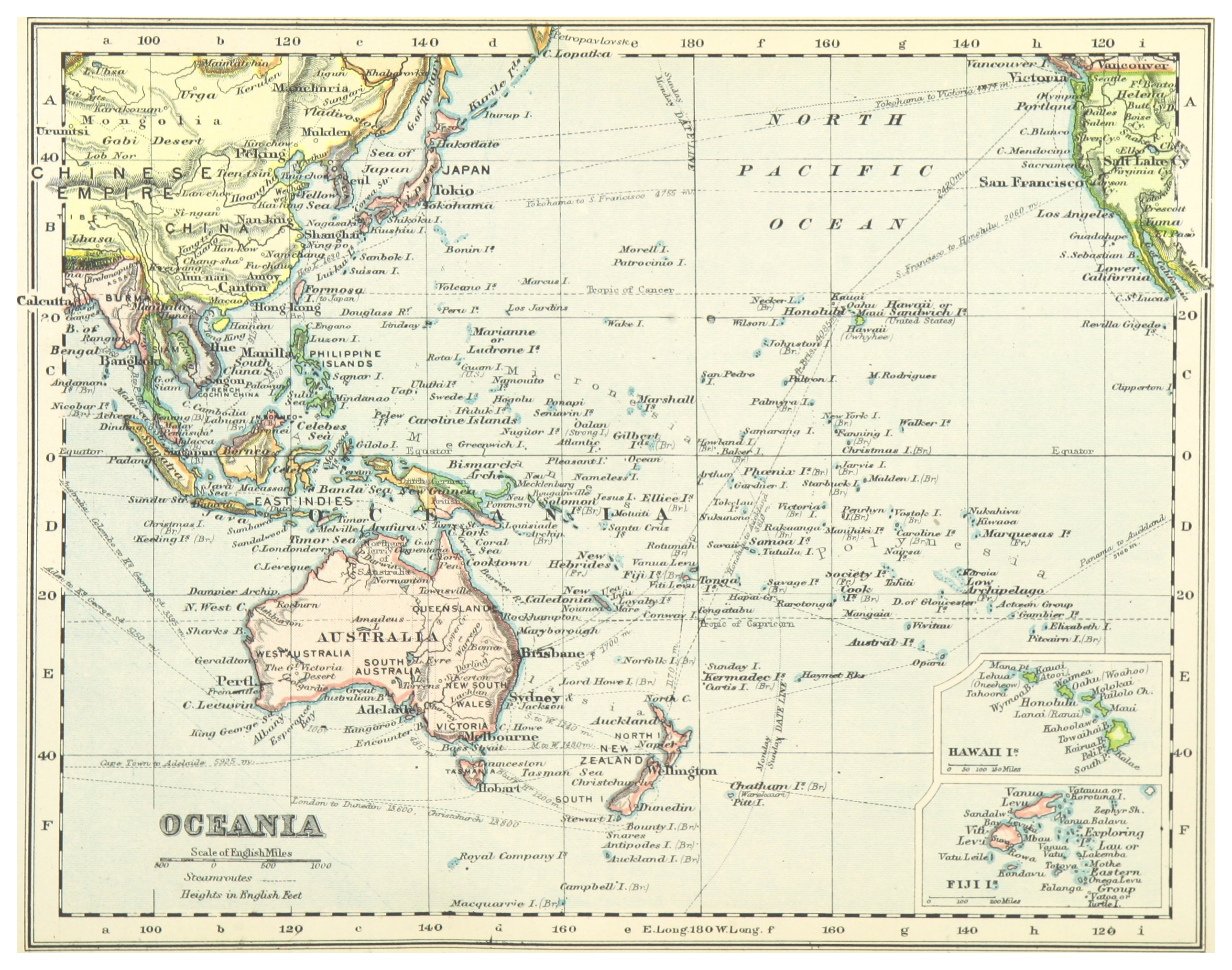
An 1899 British map showing Los Jardines northeast of the Marianas and northwest of the Marshalls

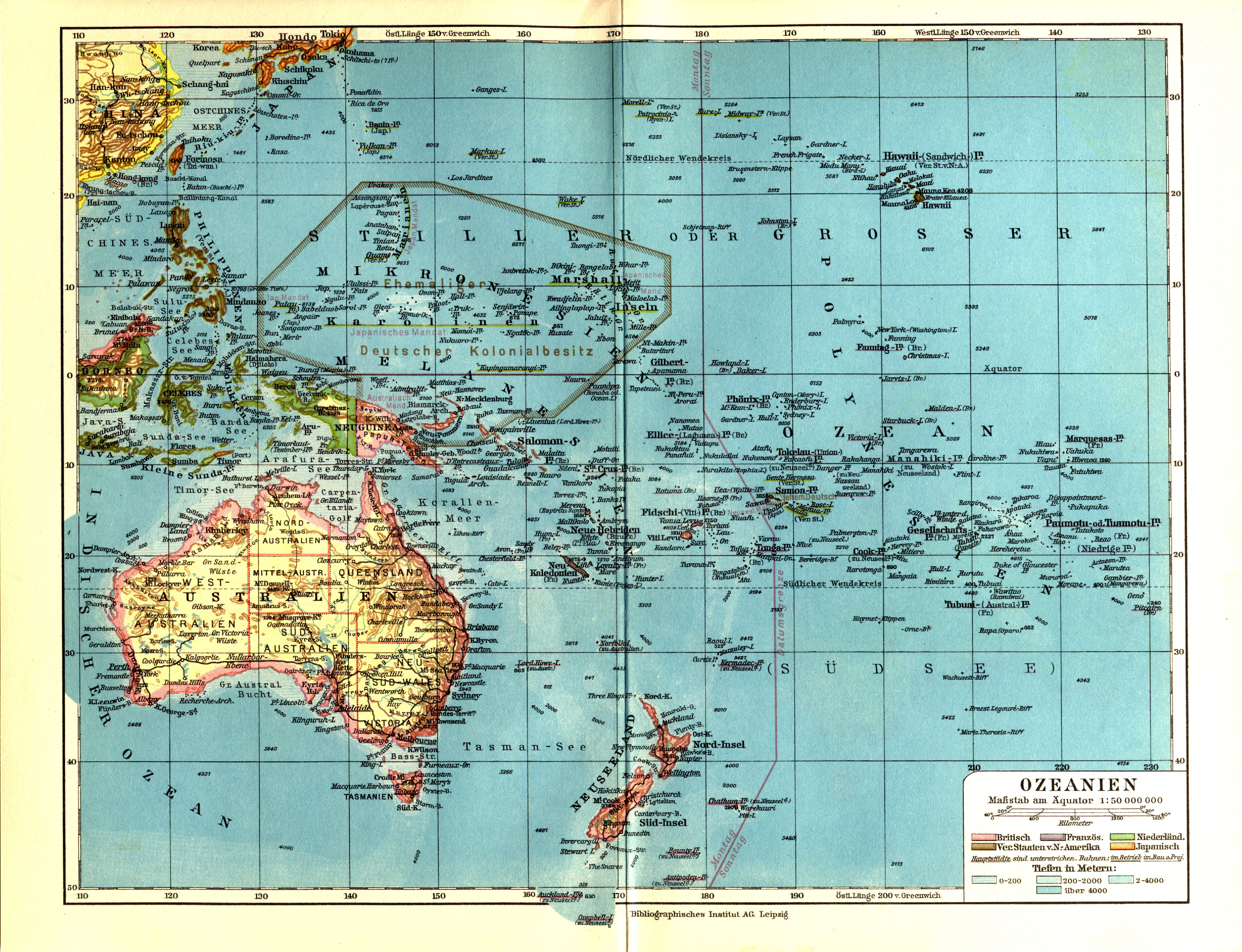
A 1932 German map showing northeast of the Marianas and northwest of the Marshalls
