= Gomes de Sequeira =

Portuguese explorer

Gomes de Sequeira was a Portuguese explorer in the early 16th century. It has been suggested by some historians that Gomes de Sequeira may have sailed to the northeast coast of Australia as part of his explorations, although this is disputed.

In 1525 Gomes de Sequeira was pilot of a small ship captained by Diogo da Rocha, when in the Molucca Passage it was driven 200 to 300 leagues to the northeast by a storm to a large island. The island was given the name Ilha de Gomes de Sequeira. In 1975 William A. Lessa identified the island as Ulithi in the Caroline Islands.

== See also ==
- Theory of Portuguese discovery of Australia
- History of Australia before 1901
- Portuguese discoveries
