= João da Gama =

16th-century Portuguese explorer

João da Gama (c. 1540 – after 1591) was a Portuguese explorer and colonial administrator in the Far East in the last quarter of the 16th century. He was the grandson of Vasco da Gama. João da Gama sailed from Macau to northeast and rounded Japan by north. He crossed the Pacific Ocean at the northernmost latitudes taken until then by Europeans. Forced by the circumstances of his voyage, he became also a circumnavigator (one of the first to do it eastwards). The lands northeast of Japan which João da Gama discovered were the target of legend and speculation in the centuries that followed, inspiring its search by European powers.

== Early years and voyages to the East ==
Not much is known of his childhood and youth, though is believed that he was born around 1540. His parents were Guiomar de Vilhena, Countess of Vidigueira and Francisco da Gama, 2nd Count of Vidigueira, son of the explorer Vasco da Gama, the discoverer of the sea route to the East. He was married with Joana de Menezes and had one son, Vasco da Gama, who later became captain in Chaul.

João da Gama became the captain of Malacca between 1578 and 1582. He received cordially the Portuguese representative who brought the news of the coronation of Philip II of Spain as king of Portugal, but only recognized the new order later, after indication of the Viceroy of India. He had numerous political conflicts within his mandate, caused by alleged personal irregularities that had brought him into political confrontation with the administrative bodiesof the city, which led to a Judicial process. He was accused of harming the interests of Malacca and called to Lisbon to answer for his actions and expose his defense. He returned to the East with the aim of fulfilling the nanban trade (the "voyage of Japan"), between Macau (China) and Nagasaki (Japan), a trade route monopolized by Portugal. Gama was married to the daughter of D. João de Meneses Baroche, Captain of Cochin. He left his wife at his residence in Cochin and headed to Macau in 1588, accompanied by his brother Miguel da Gama. In that year the annual voyage had not yet been carried due to the sudden death of the captain of Macau, Jerónimo de Sousa. Following the trade agreement between the Portuguese-Jew New Christian Bartolomeu Landeiro and the city of Macau, Jerónimo de Sousa was also preparing to send a ship to the Philippines. In parallel to this, was then issued the anti-Christian edict in Japan. João da Gama, hoping to get a higher profit and new possibilities, and against all prohibitions, decided for an expedition to New Spain at his own expense and at his own risk.

Da Gama was well-regarded in Macau, as can be seen from the letter that the Macau City Council wrote to the king on 30 June 1588, in which praises da Gama, then captain of Macau and Japan. They also asked the king that he be granted for life with this captaincy. The Câmara of Macau also mentions the subject of a recent Spanish (Castilian) travel to Macau, and the reasons why should be prohibited, among other subjects. Gama and the Council of Macau also argued that the profits of the voyage could sustain churches, a Misericordia, and two hospitals, being a leper one of them. Da Gama took possession of a carrack of 600 tons that instead of going from Macau to India, went to Mexico, where they could accomplish much more lucrative deals, which were coveted by residents of Macau. Years later, members of the Macau City Council would publicly condemn and criticize da Gama and his voyage.

== Crossing of the Pacific ==
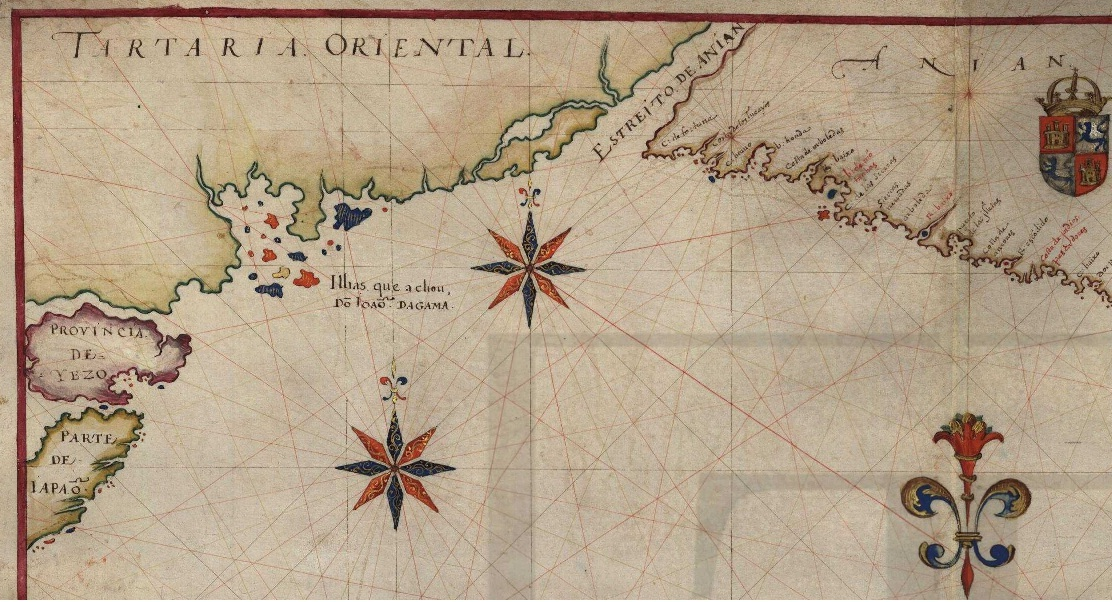
Atlas of João Teixeira Albernaz I, 1643, showing the North Pacific Ocean and the area reached by João da Gama, including islands João da Gama found (possibly the Kuril islands, hypothesis clearly shown by maps as of Joseph Nicolas Delisle. Other maps also made reference to a mythical more largest land, also northeast of Japan). The mythical or "recognized" Strait of Anián, separating Asia and the Americas, is also shown. Part of the known North American coast is possibly widely shifted to the northwest

The decision of D. João da Gama, a risk taker, was taken with the knowledge that it was an illegal enterprise, since it was well known the prohibition of trade between the world areas of Portugal and Castile (later Spain) by the Treaties of Tordesillas and Zaragoza, ban reinforced by the letters personally written by Philip II to the Viceroys of New Spain and India, and also directly to the administrative bodies of Macau and the Philippines in 1589 and 1590s, leading to the expulsion of the Spanish from Macau in 1592.

The unusual and exceptional decision to make the journey was due to the expectation that the initiative might be regarded with tolerance, as happened to some Spanish precedents to Macau, but on the other hand, seems it had been taken in desperate position because da Gama was possibly aware that if he returned to Goa, he would possibly be arrested due to charges of having committed serious irregularities. This reality is reflected in the letter that the king Phillip II (I of Portugal) sent to the Viceroy on February 6, 1589, which ordered him "that the noble (João da Gama) that came from China, should be arrest in irons and taken to the Kingdom aboard this Armada", as was also appointed before, in 1587, by the Crown.

João da Gama, however, seemed unaware of this reality in 1588, since he sent from Macau, on November 20 of the same year, a letter to the king informing him of his intention to go to Spain via Mexico, with an alleged justification of give in person to the king part of his mission to China, and show how easy it seemed to be undertaken its conquest (in fact the Portuguese in Macau were against such project). Two days earlier, on November 18, Domingos Segurado, in Macau, also wrote to the king to inform the wreck of a Spanish ship from New Spain in Macau, and the shipment of its crew on da Gama's ship, owner of the voyage to Japan, which, once in Macau, accepted the order of the Viceroy of India to transport that crew to Mexico, being himself in the office of Captain of Macau during Gama's absence, even suggesting his own appointment to that office, or as a reward for his services, the provision of two voyages from China to New Spain.

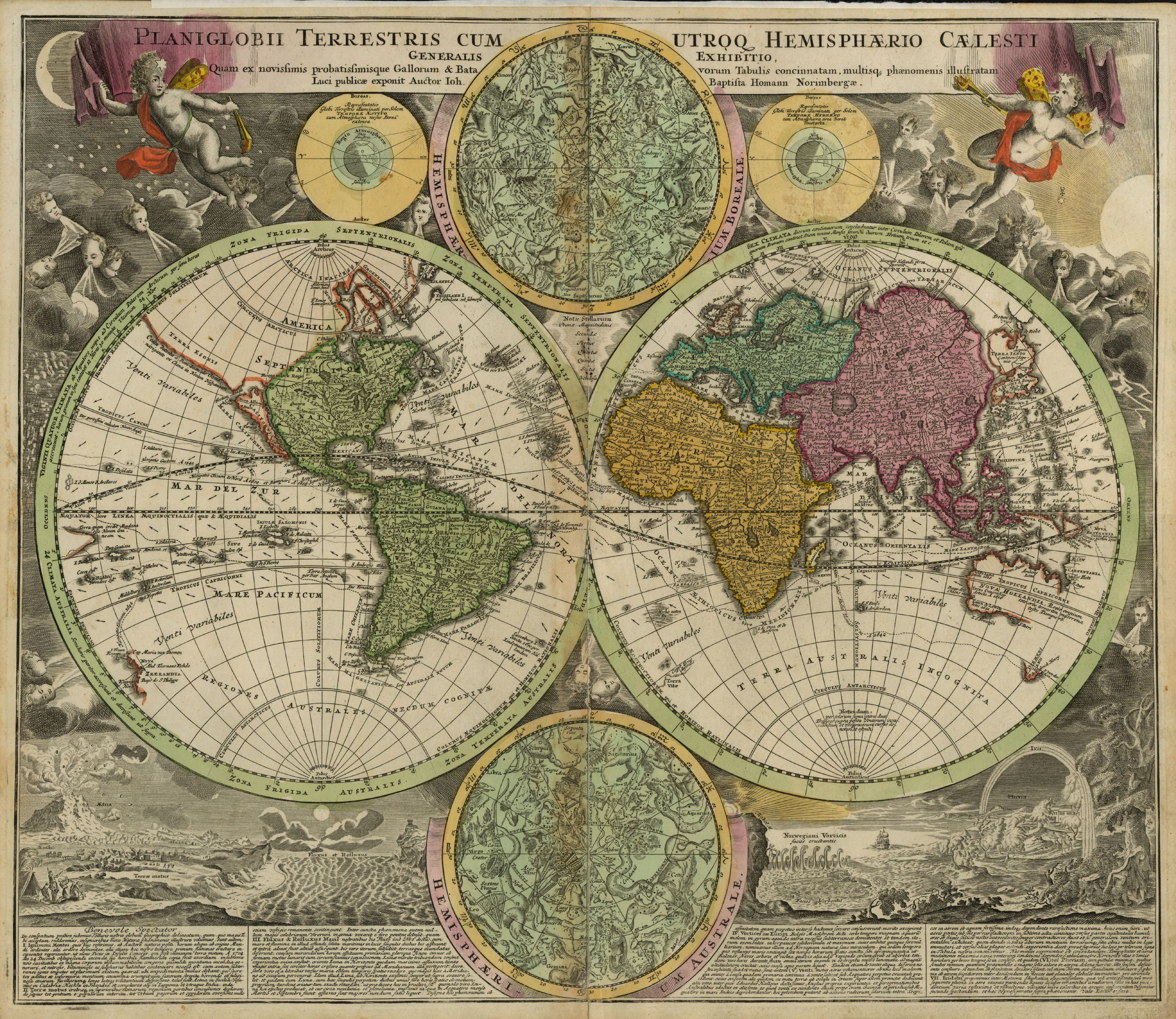
Planiglobii Terrestris Cum Utroque Hemisphaerio Caelesti Generalis Exhibitio by Johann Baptiste Homann, Nuremberg 1707. Planisphere with map of the North American west coast, with both Californias (including US California to capes Mendoncino, Sebastiano and Blanco at 40º-45º N, at east-southeast of the imaginary strait) drawn as a single island, and with the note: "Costa Terrae borealis incognitae detected by D. João da Gama sailing from China to New Spain". Legend repeated in his other map of 1720, more extended to the northwest and already with both the Californias connected to mainland, in a northwest coast, possibly corresponding to the present day United States north coast and Canada

After starting the voyage in Macau and due to a damage caused by a typhon, da Gama was forced to seek refuge at the island of Amakusa on the Japanese coast. After repairs, he continued on his voyage in October 1589. He reached Mexico after having traversed the Pacific at a much higher latitude (around 45° N and possibly further north) than the course ordinarily taken by the Spanish Manila galleons (usually near or around 40° N) travelling between Manila and Mexico. Da Gama touched at a place which has since been called Ezo (Yezo) – the island of Hokkaido, followed by unveiling a 'Land of Gama", which may correspond to one or some of the Kuril Islands. Arriving at Acapulco in March 1590, the navigator may well have gone north along the Japanese main coasts and the Kuril Islands, to near the Aleutians and then down to the American coast. His name was attached, originally on Portuguese maps, to a vague land he sighted northeast of Japan.

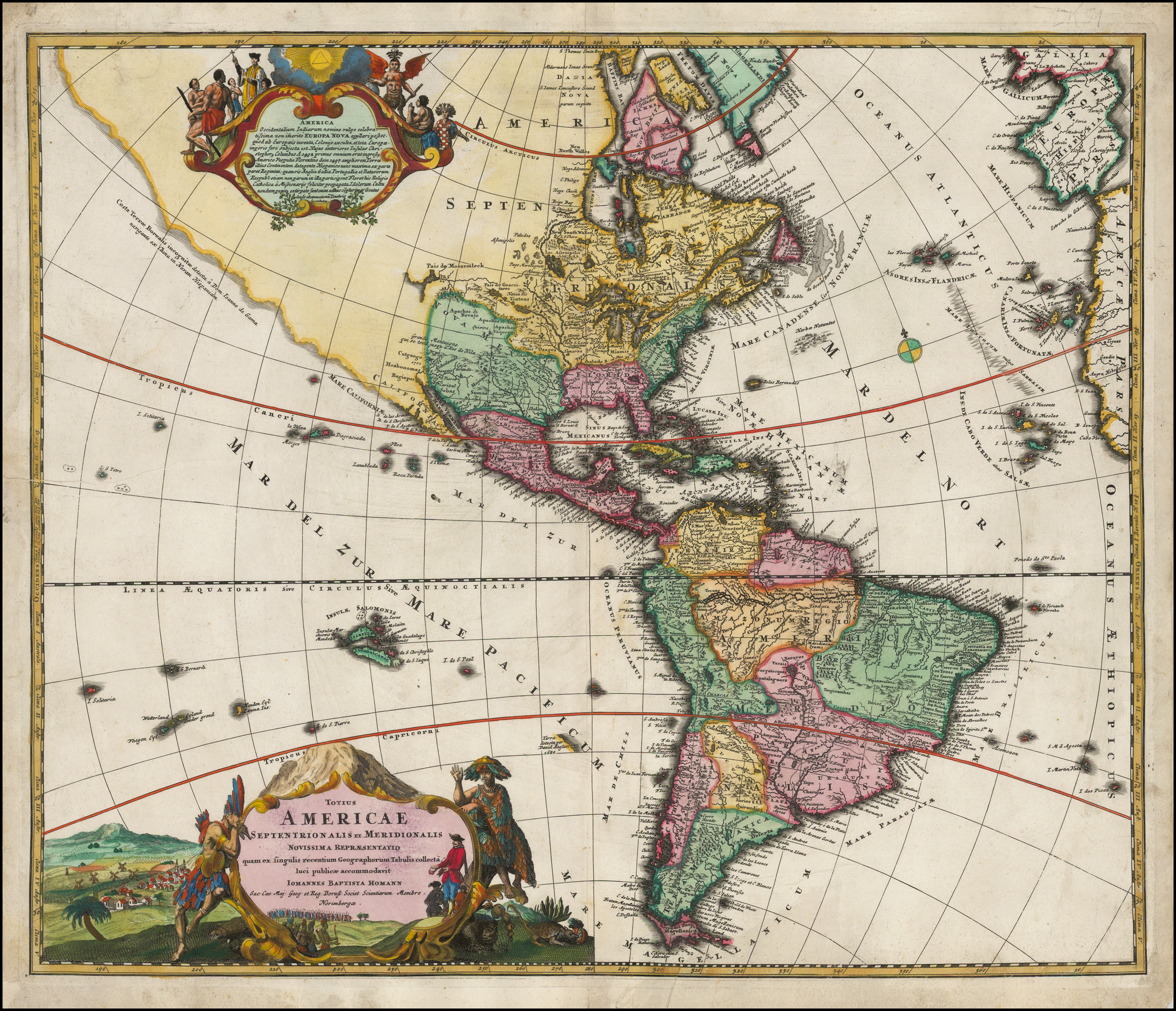
The Americas in 1720 by Johann Homann with Terra Esonis recognized by João da Gama, traveling from China to New Spain

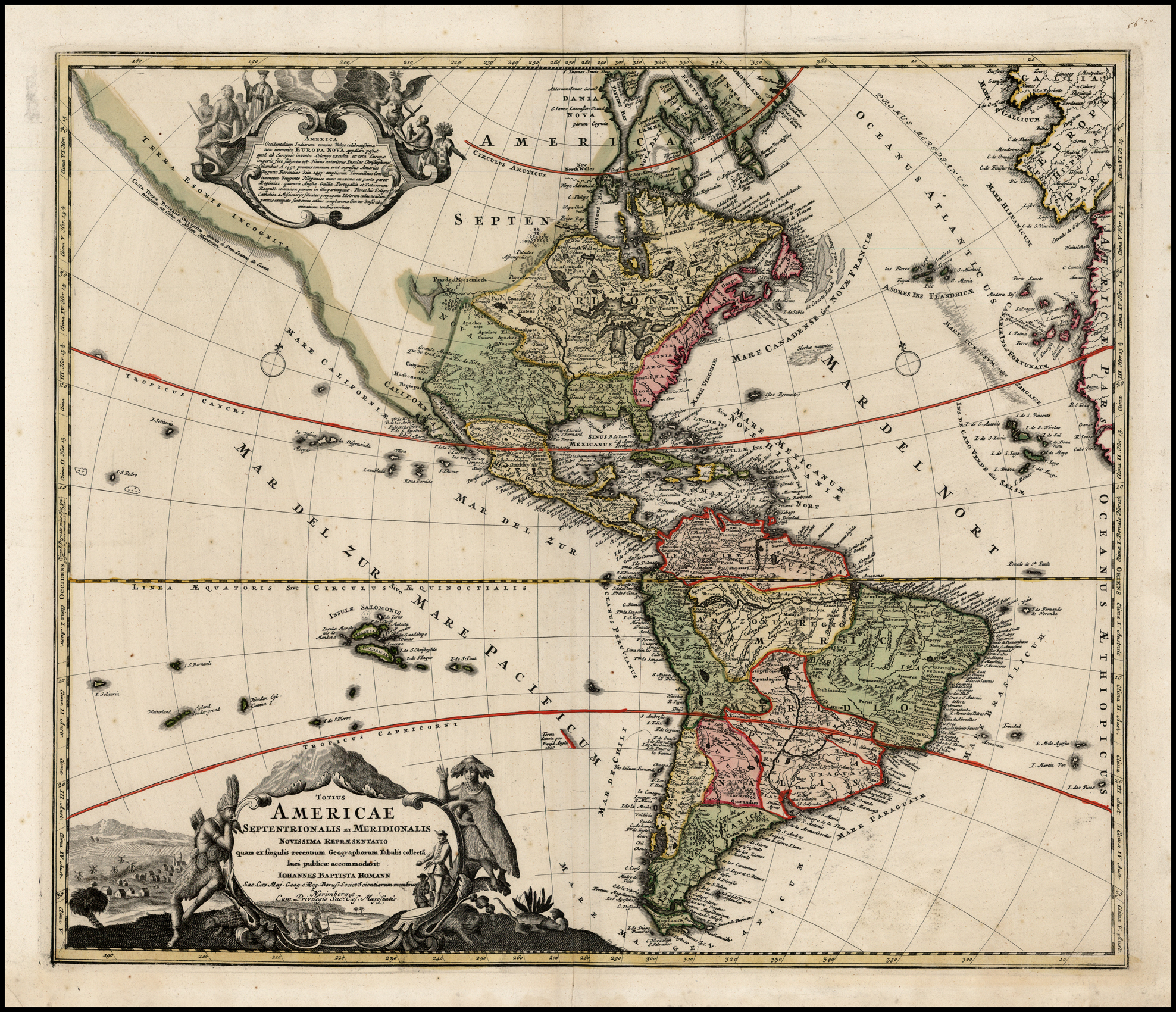
The Americas in 1720 by the same Johann Baptiste Homann, with the same northern land Esonis incognitae sighted by João da Gama

The hypothesis that João da Gama explored or reached North America as far north as Juan Rodriguez Cabrillo, Bartolomé Ferrer, Francis Drake, and Francisco Gali, who (in 1584) had sailed from Macau and possibly sighted islands with metals 500 leagues to the east or east-northeast of southeast Japan (around 29° N or further north), or as later, Sebastião Rodrigues Soromenho, or landed further north, taking into account his route from the East, lacks direct evidence, due to the loss of much of the documentation on the nearby North American route he took and on his other possible landings in North America, except on the news of his successful arrival in Acapulco, in March 1590. Nevertheless, several maps later point to João da Gama's exploration and discovery of a large portion of the west and northwest of the then unknown and known coasts of North America. In the 1630s, documents came into possession of the Portuguese cartographer João Teixeira Albernaz when he was in Seville. The papers eventually included a sketch of a long north Pacific coast which João da Gama skimmed en route.

Arriving in Acapulco, before being arrested, he managed to sell the goods, through two Sephardic New Christians, and getting in the negotiations 22,000 pesos, of which two thousand would be used to pay debts and the remaining twenty thousand would be sent to Brazil inland through his representatives (four traders, two of which would possibly be New Christians). It seems they were successful in the mission.

Da Gama's voyage was directly contrary to the Iberian crown legislation, prohibiting commercial transactions between the Spanish and the Portuguese empires. Accordingly, he was arrested and his ship and remained cargo impounded by the local authorities. However, in spite of the fact that Portugal and Spain were then "united", da Gama's remained goods and his charts and logs of navigation were confiscated. His remained goods were evaluated at 140,000 pesos. The process of João da Gama went to Casa de la Contratación in Seville, where it came to drag. Indeed, the enterprise of João da Gama was no more welcome to Spain that had been that of Vasco, his grandfather, a century before. The Portuguese crew and merchants who had participated in the trip returned to Macau via Philippines, after a stay in Mexico, where they brought silver, and he himself was sent to Seville to be tried by the audiencia of the Casa de la Contratación. João da Gama became one of the first men to complete an eastward circumnavigation of the globe.

In the trans-Pacific crossing from Macau to Acapulco da Gama was preceded by Francisco Gali and Pedro de Unamuno.

Before seeing solved the process to which he was subjected, João da Gama have possibly died in Spain or Portugal after 1591 or 1592.

== Search for "Joao-da-Gama-Land" or "Gamaland" ==
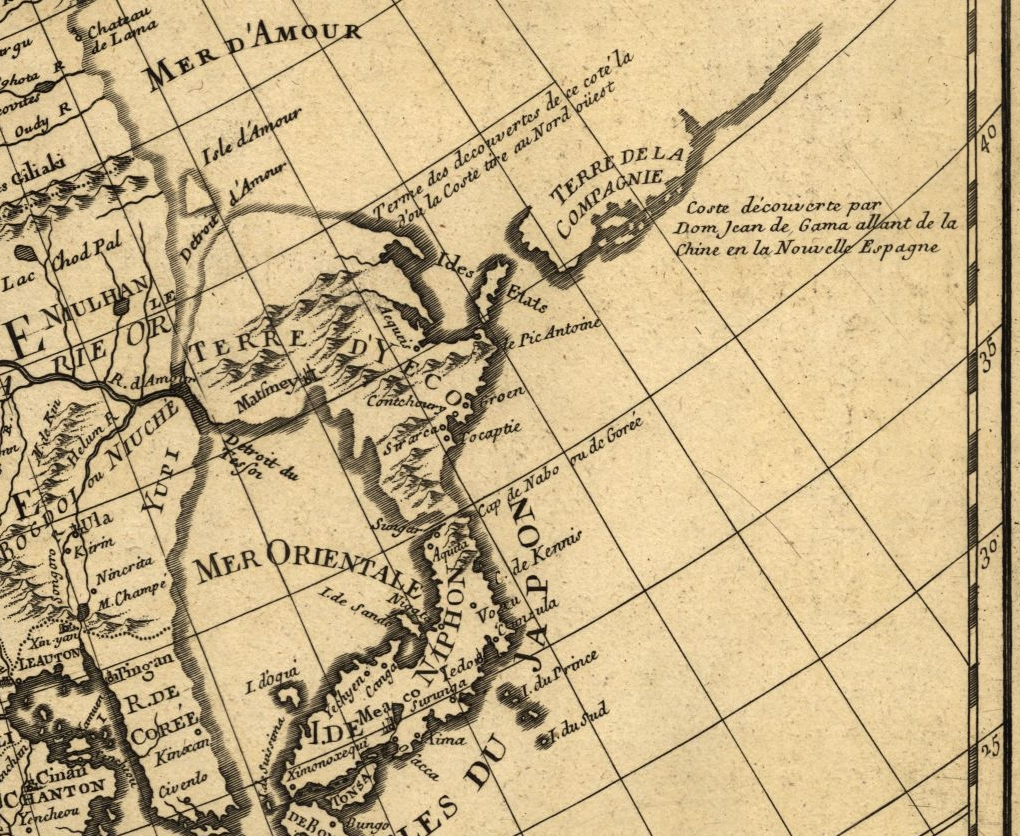
Guillaume Delisle's map of Asia, describing Company Land as "Coste découverte par Dom Jean de Gama allant de la Chine à la Nouvelle Espagne".

In the 18th century, the Russians, after crossing Siberia and reaching the Bering Strait between Siberia and Alaska, took the initiative in exploring the northern edges of the Pacific. One of the goals of the Russian Great Northern Expedition, led by the Russian (Danish-born) explorer Vitus Bering, was to proceed from Okhotsk on Kamchatka and reconnoiter from there for the legendary "Joao-da-Gama-Land". From "Joao-da-Gama-Land", Bering's group was to set out farther east to the coast of North America.

The mythical Gamaland was believed either to have existed between Kamchatka and the American continent. During the next 150 years contradictory maps depicted a jumble of real or imagined islands between Hokkaido and Kamchatka, confusing the existing Kuril Islands with the Company's Land, State Island (named after the exploration in 1643 of the main southern Kuril Islands and Sakhalin by the Dutch explorer Maarten Gerritsz Vries), Terra Esonis, and Gamaland. Sometime around 1731, the Russian Admiralty College requested the Academy of Sciences to prepare a map of the North Pacific. Joseph Nicolas Delisle prepared the map and an accompanying mémoire based on work done by his elder brother Guillaume. This showed the three islands mentioned above and the "Land seen by Dom Juan de Gama", which trails off in the direction of America. When the route of the second voyage of Vitus Bering was determined in Petropavlovsk in May 1741, this map or another based on it clearly influenced the choice.

== See also ==
- Francisco Gali
- Pedro de Unamuno
