= Anson Archipelago =

Phantom islands in the North Pacific

Coordinates: 30°45′N 154°25′E

The Anson Archipelago was a designation for a widely scattered group of purported islands in the Western North Pacific Ocean between Japan and Hawaii. The group was supposed to include Wake Island and Marcus Island, as well as many phantom islands such as Los Jardines, Ganges Island, Rica de Oro, and Rica de Plata (the latter two sometimes referred to as Roca de Oro and Roca de Plata). The archipelago was named after George Anson, who seized Spanish navigational charts of these waters during his voyage around the world.

As time passed, it turned out there were no islands west of Kure Atoll (Ocean Island until the 1920s) until reaching Japan. To the east and north of what was alleged to be Anson is the Hawaiian–Emperor seamount chain, the eastern portion of which form the real Hawaiian island chain.

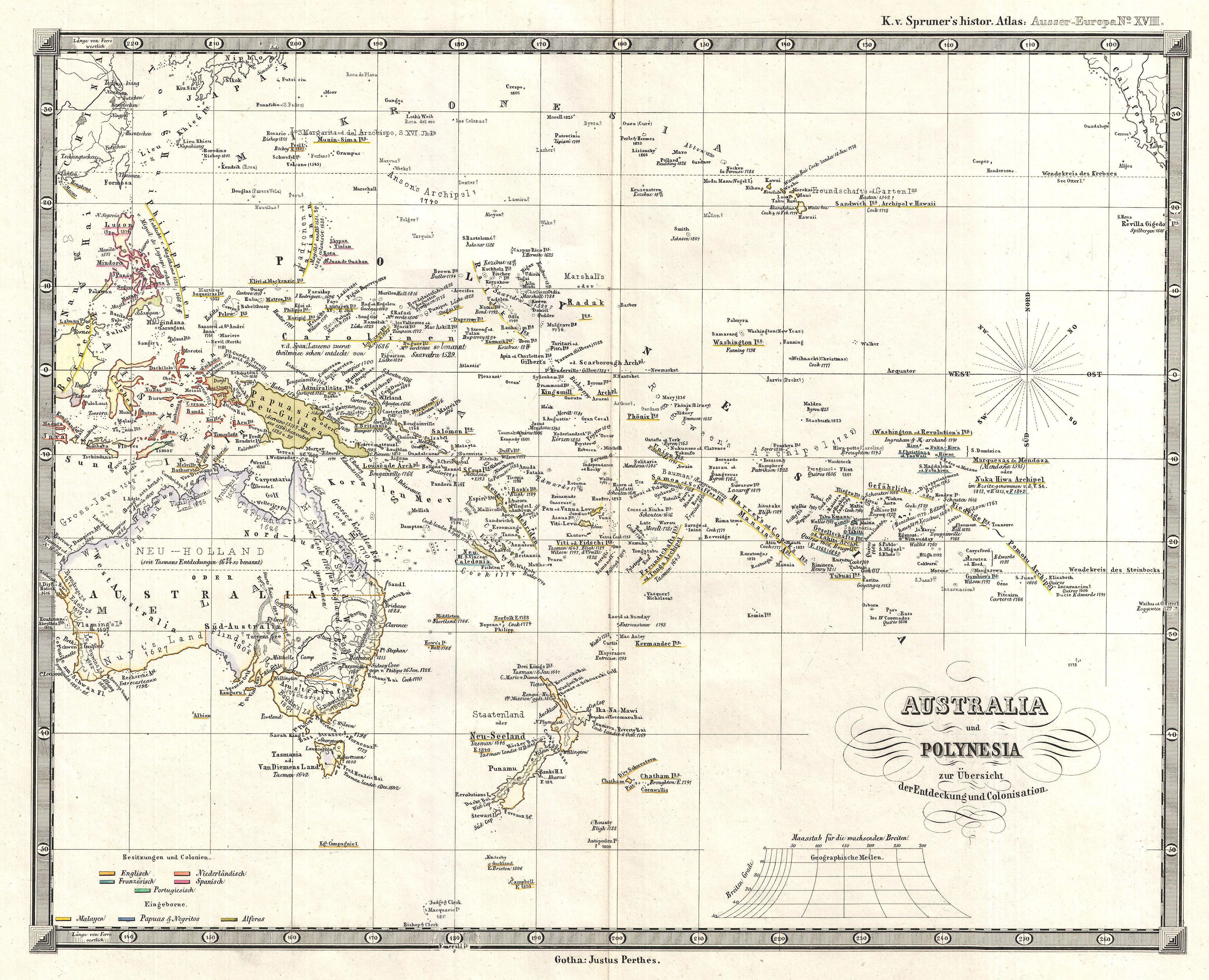
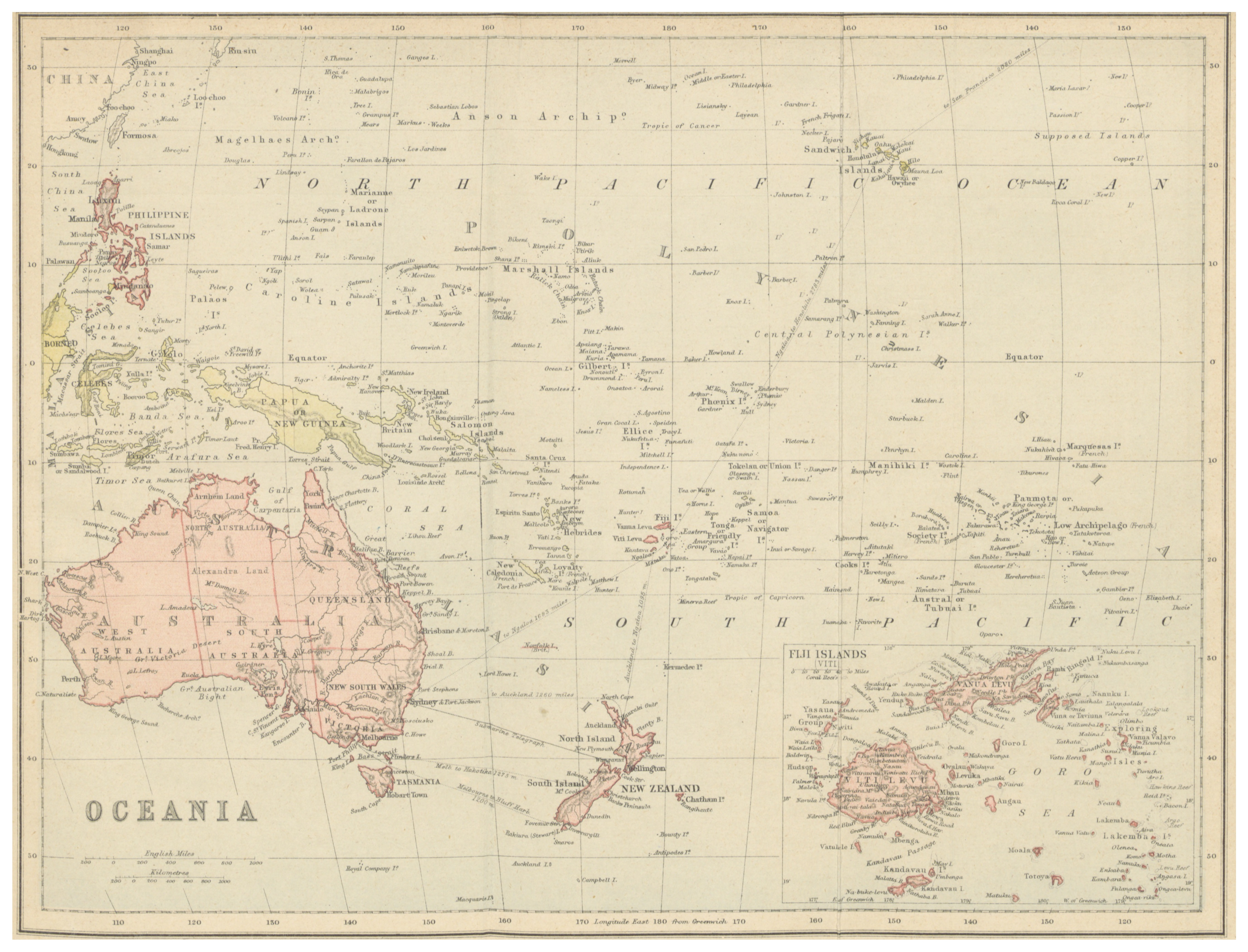
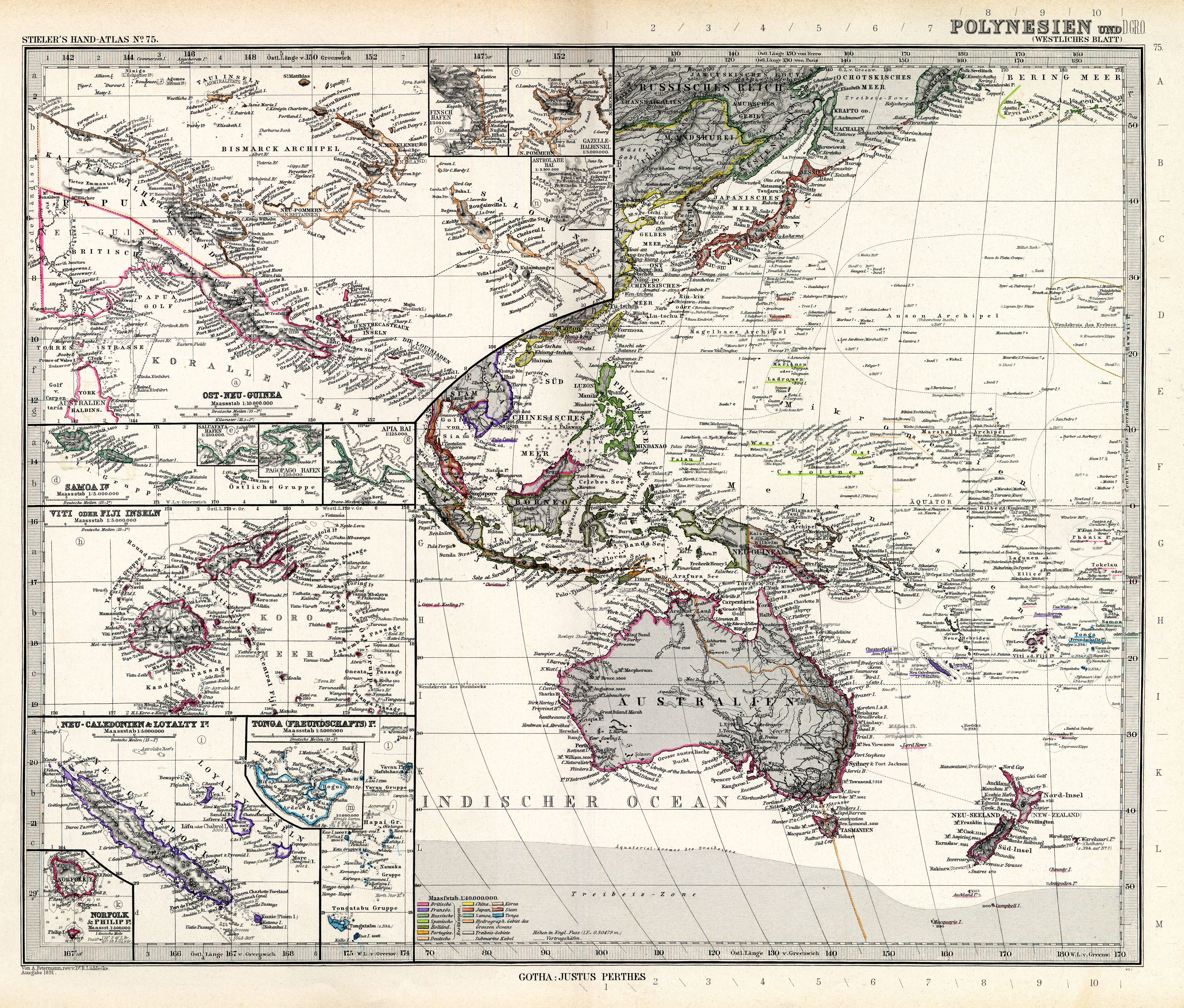
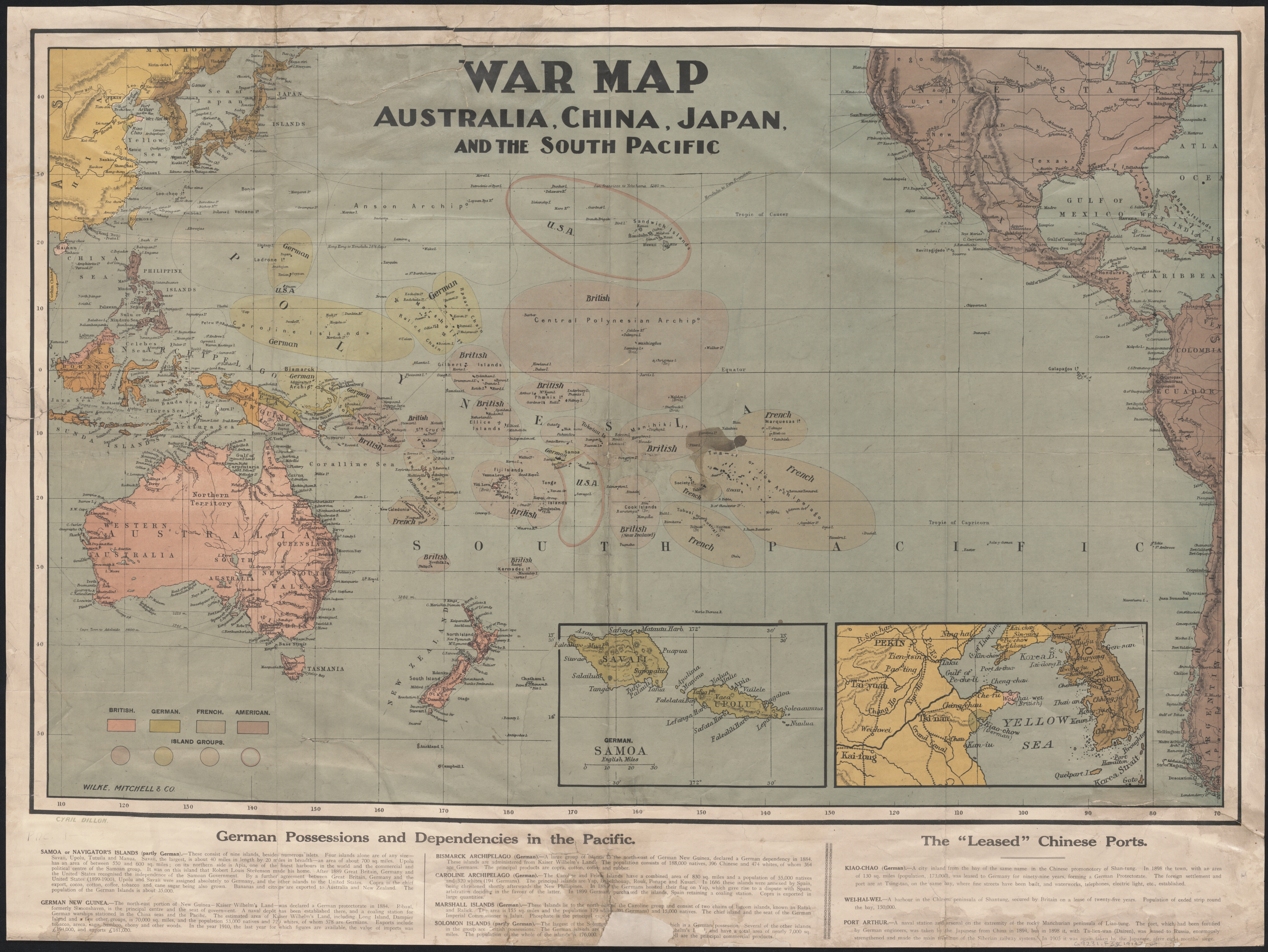

== See also ==
- Pedro de Unamuno
- Chryse and Argyre
- Byer's Island
- Mid-Pacific Mountains
- List of islands in the Pacific Ocean
- Phantom islands
