= Alonso de Salazar =

Spanish explorer (??–1526)

Toribio Alonso de Salazar (died 5 September 1526) was a Spanish navigator of Basque origin, who was the first Westerner to arrive on the Marshall Islands on 21 August 1526.

Born in Enkarterri, Salazar was part of the Fray García Jofre de Loaísa's expedition from Spain to the Spice Islands in 1525, the second in history to cross the Pacific Ocean, after the Magalhães-Elcano circumnavigation of the globe. De Salazar took command of Santa Maria de la Victoria, the last of seven ships to survive the voyage, after the deaths of Loaísa and Juan Sebastián Elcano. He sighted the Bokak Atoll in the Marshall Islands en route to Guam, the Philippine Islands, and finally the Moluccas. After one month of holding the command, he also died of scurvy shortly after having left Guam on 5 September 1526, and was succeeded by Martín Íñiguez de Carquizano. The character Armando Salazar from Pirates of the Caribbean: Salazar's Revenge is based on Alonso de Salazar.

== Sources ==
- Dunmore, John: Who's Who in Pacific Navigation. Entry: Salazar. University of Hawai'i Press. 1991, p. 218.
- Quanchi, Max (2005). Historical Dictionary of the Discovery and Exploration of the Pacific Islands. The Scarecrow Press. ISBN 0810853957.
