= Diogo da Rocha =

Captain who sailed for Portugal

Diogo da Rocha was a captain who sailed for the Portuguese. He is credited as being the first to encounter the islands of Ulithi and Yap, reportedly encountering both islands in 1526.
