= Kuril Islands =

Island chain in Northeast Asia

Disputed islands Native name: Курильские острова (Russian); 千島列島 (Japanese)
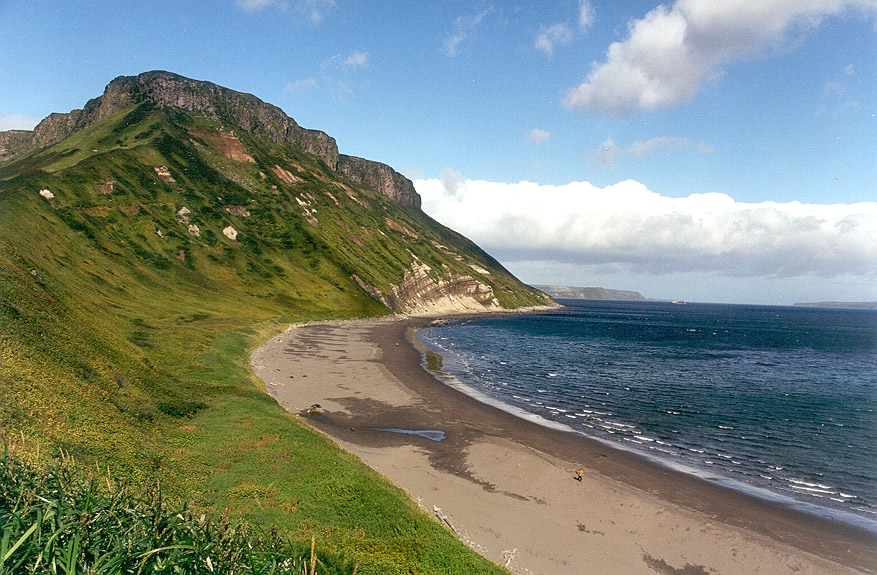
- A coastline along one of the Kuril Islands

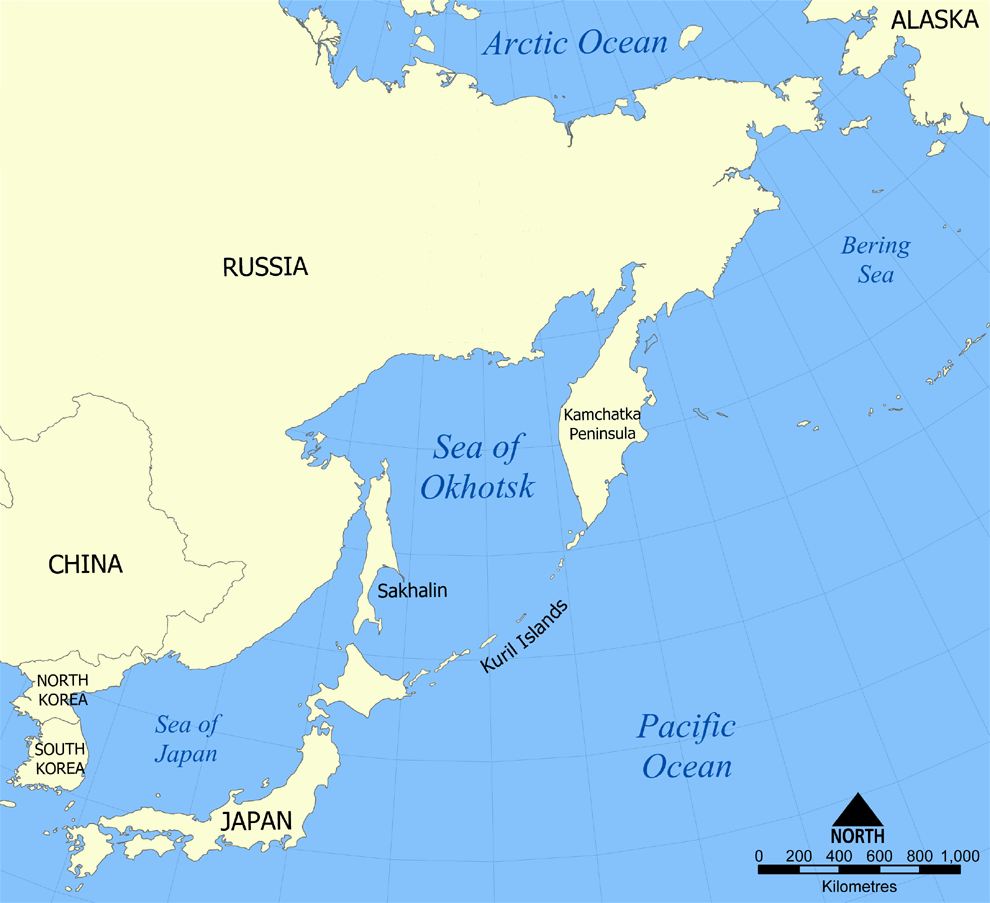
- Location of the Kuril Islands in the Western Pacific between Japan and the Kamchatka Peninsula of Russia

Geography
- Location: Pacific Ocean
- Coordinates: 47.0°N 152.1°E
- Total islands: 56
- Area: 10,503.2 km^{2} (4,055.3 sq mi)
- Length: 1,150 km (715 mi)
- Highest elevation: 2,339 m (7674 ft)
- Highest point: Alaid, Atlasov Island

Administration
- Russia
- Federal subject: Sakhalin Oblast
- Districts: Severo-Kurilsky, Kurilsky, Yuzhno-Kurilsky

Claimed by
- Japan (partial claim, southernmost islands)
- Prefecture: Hokkaido
- Subprefecture: Nemuro

Demographics
- Population: 21,501 (2021)
- Ethnic groups: majority Russians

Composite map of the islands between Kamchatka Peninsula and Nemuro Peninsula, combining twelve U.S. Army Map Service maps compiled in the early 1950s

The Kuril Islands or Kurile Islands (Note: /ˈk(j)ʊərɪl, kjʊˈriːl/ KURE-il, KOOR-il, kyuu-REEL; Russian: Кури́льские острова́, romanized: Kuríl'skiye ostrová, IPA: [kʊˈrʲilʲskʲɪjə ɐstrɐˈva]; Japanese: 千島列島, romanized: Chishima rettō, IPA: [tɕiɕima ɾeꜜttoː], lit. 'Thousand-Island Archipelago', or クリル列島, Kuriru rettō [kɯɾiɾɯ ɾeꜜttoː].) are a volcanic archipelago administered as part of Sakhalin Oblast in the Russian Far East. The islands stretch approximately 1,300 km (810 mi) northeast from Hokkaido in Japan to Kamchatka Peninsula in Russia, separating the Sea of Okhotsk from the north Pacific Ocean. There are 56 islands and many minor islets. The Kuril Islands consist of the Greater Kuril Chain and, at the southwest end, the parallel Lesser Kuril Chain. The group termed the 'South Kurils' consists of those of the Lesser Kuril Chain together with Kunashir and Iturup in the Greater Kuril Chain. The Vries Strait between Iturup and Urup forms the Miyabe Line dividing the North and South Kurils. The Kuril Islands cover an area of around 10,503.2 square kilometres (4,055.3 sq mi), with a population of roughly 20,000.

The islands have been under Russian administration since their 1945 invasion by the Soviet Union near the end of World War II. Japan claims the four southernmost islands, including two of the three largest (Iturup and Kunashir), as part of its territory, as well as Shikotan and the unpopulated Habomai islets, which has led to the ongoing Kuril Islands dispute. The disputed islands are known in Japan as the country's "Northern Territories".

== Etymology ==
The name Kuril originates from the autonym that the Indigenous Ainu had used for the islands, kur, meaning 'man'. It may also be related to names for other islands that have traditionally been inhabited by the Ainu people, such as Kuyi or Kuye for Sakhalin and Kai for Hokkaido. In Japanese, the Kuril Islands are known as the Chishima Islands (Kanji: 千島列島, Chishima Rettō, lit. 'Thousand-Island Archipelago'), and also as the Kuriru Islands (Katakana and Kanji: クリル列島, Kuriru Rettō). Once Russians had discovered the islands in the 18th century, they derived a name for islands from the Russian kurit′ курить 'to smoke' due to the perpetual volcanic plumes emitting from the islands' volcanoes resembling smoke.

== Geography and climate ==
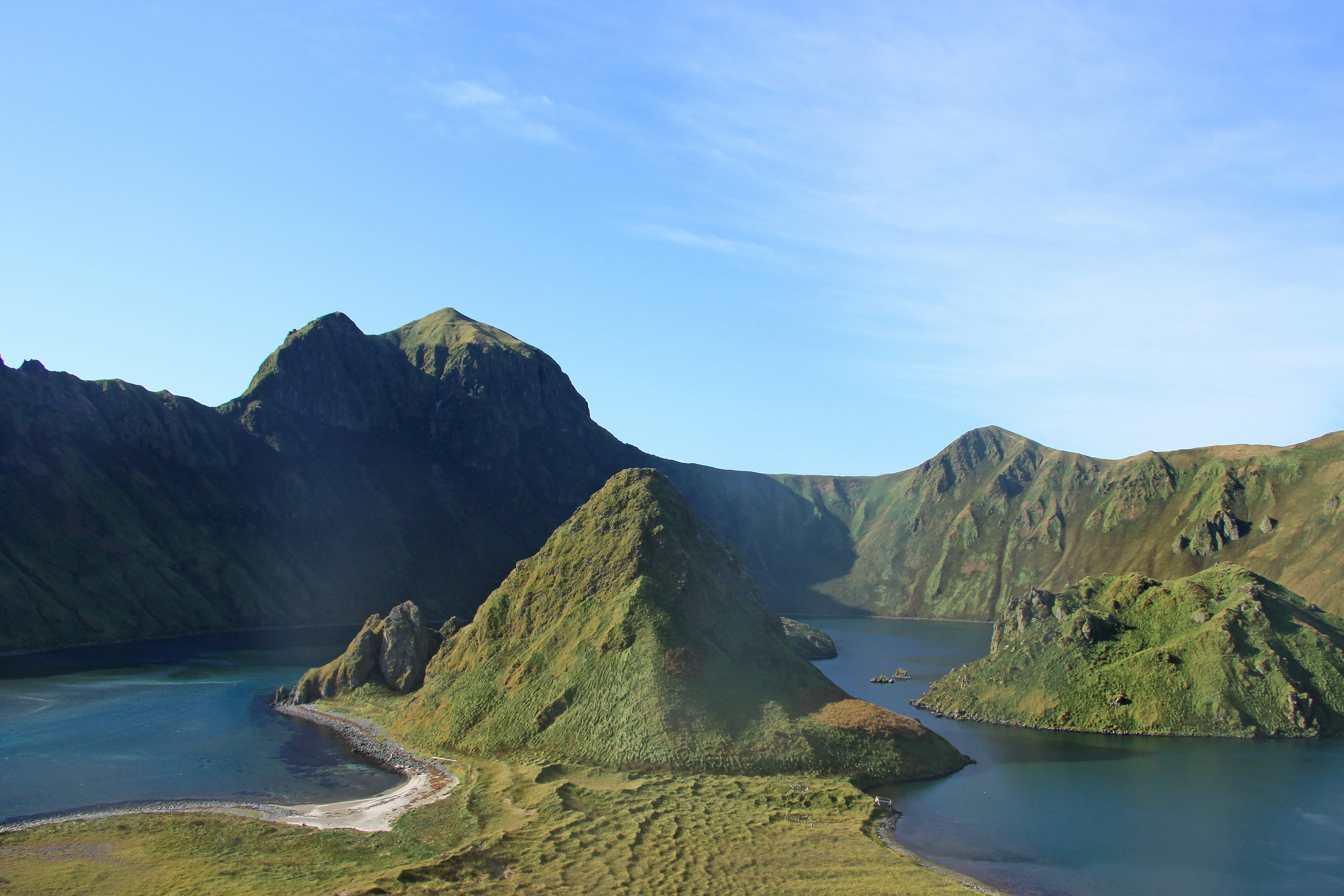
Caldera of the island Ushishir

The Kuril Islands form part of the ring of tectonic instability encircling the Pacific Ocean referred to as the Ring of Fire. The islands themselves are summits of stratovolcanoes that are a direct result of the subduction of the Pacific Plate under the Okhotsk Plate, which forms the Kuril Trench some 200 kilometres (124 mi) east of the islands. The chain has around 100 volcanoes, some 40 of which are active, and many hot springs and fumaroles. There is frequent seismic activity, including a magnitude 8.5 earthquake in 1963 and one of magnitude 8.3 recorded on 15 November 2006, which resulted in tsunami waves up to 1.5 metres (5 ft) reaching the California coast. Raikoke Island, near the centre of the archipelago, has an active volcano which erupted again in June 2019, with emissions reaching 13,000 m (42,651 ft).

The climate on the islands is generally severe, with long, cold, stormy winters and short and notoriously foggy summers. The average annual precipitation is 40 to 50 inches (1,020 to 1,270 mm), a large portion of which falls as snow. The Köppen climate classification of most of the Kurils is subarctic (Dfc), although Kunashir is humid continental (Dfb). However, the Kuril Islands' climate resembles the subpolar oceanic climate of southwest Alaska much more than the hypercontinental climate of Manchuria and interior Siberia, as precipitation is heavy and permafrost completely absent. It is characterized by mild summers with only 1 to 3 months above 10 °C or 50 °F and cold, snowy, extremely windy winters below −3 °C or 26.6 °F, although usually above −10 °C or 14 °F.

The chain ranges from temperate to sub-Arctic climate types, and the vegetative cover consequently ranges from tundra in the north to dense spruce and larch forests on the larger southern islands. The highest elevations on the islands are Alaid Volcano (highest point: 2,339 m or 7,674 ft) on Atlasov Island at the northern end of the chain and Tyatya volcano (1,819 m or 5,968 ft) on Kunashir Island at the southern end.

Landscape types and habitats on the islands include many kinds of beach and rocky shores, cliffs, wide rivers and fast gravelly streams, forests, grasslands, alpine tundra, crater lakes and peat bogs. The soils are generally productive, owing to the periodic influxes of volcanic ash and, in certain places, owing to significant enrichment by seabird guano. However, many of the steep, unconsolidated slopes are susceptible to landslides and newer volcanic activity can entirely denude a landscape. Only the southernmost island has large areas covered by trees, while more northerly islands have no trees, or spotty tree cover.

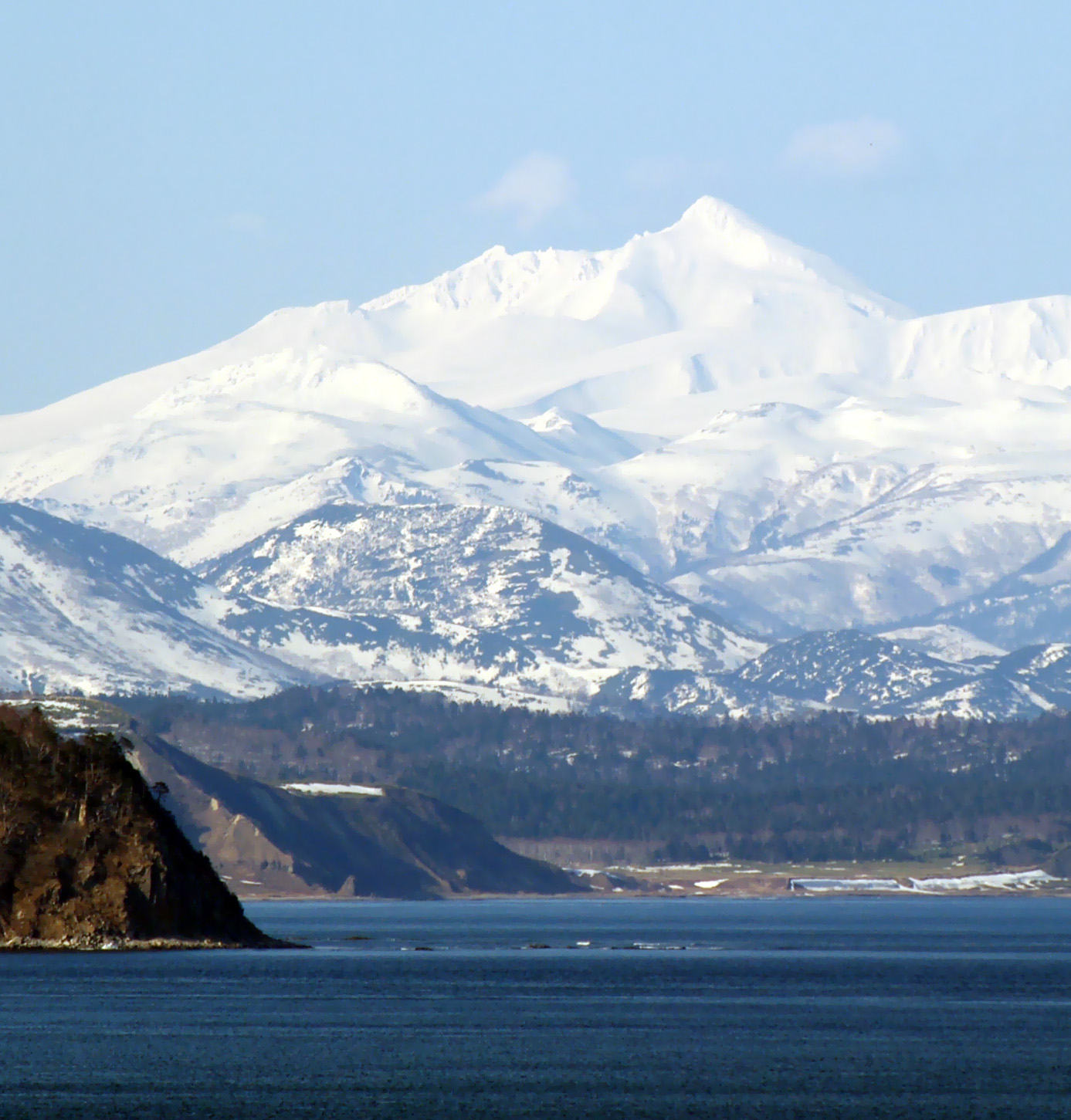
Stratovolcano Mt. Ruruy as viewed from Yuzhno-Kurilsk

The northernmost, Atlasov Island (Araido in Japanese), is an almost-perfect volcanic cone rising sheer out of the sea; it has been depicted by Japanese artists in haiku, wood-block prints, and other forms, in much the same way as the better-known Mount Fuji. Its summit is the highest point in Sakhalin Oblast.

== Nature ==
=== Marine ===
Owing to their location along the Pacific shelf edge and the confluence of Okhotsk Sea gyre and the southward Oyashio Current, the Kuril islands are surrounded by waters that are among the most productive in the North Pacific, supporting a wide range and high abundance of marine life.

Invertebrates: Extensive kelp beds surrounding almost every island provide crucial habitat for sea urchins, various mollusks and countless other invertebrates and their associated predators. Many species of squid provide a principal component of the diet of many of the smaller marine mammals and birds along the chain.

Fish: Further offshore, walleye pollock, Pacific cod, several species of flatfish are of the greatest commercial importance. During the 1980s, migratory Japanese sardine was one of the most abundant fish in the summer.

Pinniped: The main pinnipeds were a significant object of harvest for the indigenous populations of the Kuril islands, both for food and materials such as skin and bone. The long-term fluctuations in the range and distribution of human settlements along the Kuril island presumably tracked the pinniped ranges. In historical times, fur seals were heavily exploited for their fur in the 19th and early 20th centuries and several of the largest reproductive rookeries, as on Raykoke island, were extirpated. In contrast, commercial harvest of the true seals and Steller sea lions has been relatively insignificant on the Kuril islands proper. Since the 1960s there has been essentially no additional harvest and the pinniped populations in the Kuril islands appear to be fairly healthy and in some cases expanding. The notable exception is the now extinct Japanese sea lion, which was known to occasionally haul out on the Kuril islands.

Sea otters: Sea otters were exploited very heavily for their pelts in the 19th century, as shown by 19th- and 20th-century whaling catch and sighting records.

Seabirds: The Kuril islands are home to many millions of seabirds, including northern fulmars, tufted puffins, murres, kittiwakes, guillemots, auklets, petrels, gulls and cormorants. On many of the smaller islands in summer, where terrestrial predators are absent, virtually every possibly hummock, cliff niche or underneath of boulder is occupied by a nesting bird. Several of the islands, including Kunashir and the Lesser Kuril Chain in the South Kurils, and the northern Kurils from Urup to Paramushir, have been recognised as Important Bird Areas (IBAs) by BirdLife International because they support populations of various threatened bird species, including many waterbirds, seabirds and waders.

=== Terrestrial ===
The composition of terrestrial species on the Kuril islands is dominated by Asian mainland taxa via migration from Hokkaido and Sakhalin Islands and by Kamchatkan taxa from the North. While highly diverse, there is a relatively low level of endemism on a species level.

The WWF divides the Kuril Islands into two ecoregions. The southern Kurils, along with southwestern Sakhalin, comprise the South Sakhalin-Kurile mixed forests ecoregion. The northern islands are part of the Kamchatka-Kurile meadows and sparse forests, a larger ecoregion that extends onto the Kamchatka Peninsula and Commander Islands. The Miyabe Line dividing the differing sets of predominant plants of the Kurils corresponds to the Vries Strait between Iturup and Urup.

Because of the generally smaller size and isolation of the central islands, few major terrestrial mammals have colonized these, though red and Arctic foxes were introduced for the sake of the fur trade in the 1880s. The bulk of the terrestrial mammal biomass is taken up by rodents, many introduced in historical times. The largest southernmost and northernmost islands are inhabited by brown bear, foxes, and martens. Leopards once inhabited the islands. Some species of deer are found on the more southerly islands. It is claimed that a wild cat, the Kurilian Bobtail, originates from the Kuril Islands. The bobtail is due to the mutation of a dominant gene. The cat has been domesticated and exported to nearby Russia and bred there, becoming a popular domestic cat.

Among terrestrial birds, ravens, peregrine falcons, some wrens and wagtails are common.

== History ==
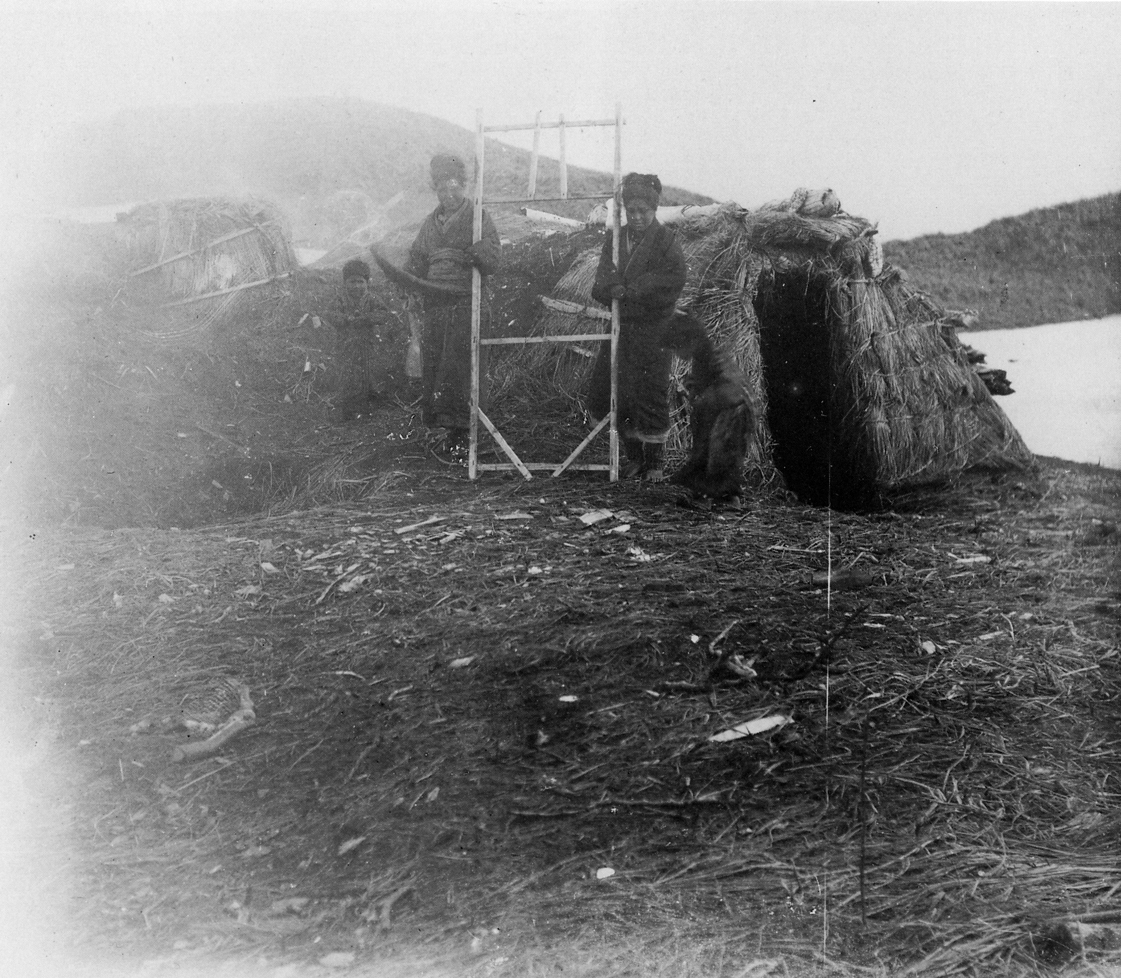
Kuril Ainu people next to their traditional dwelling

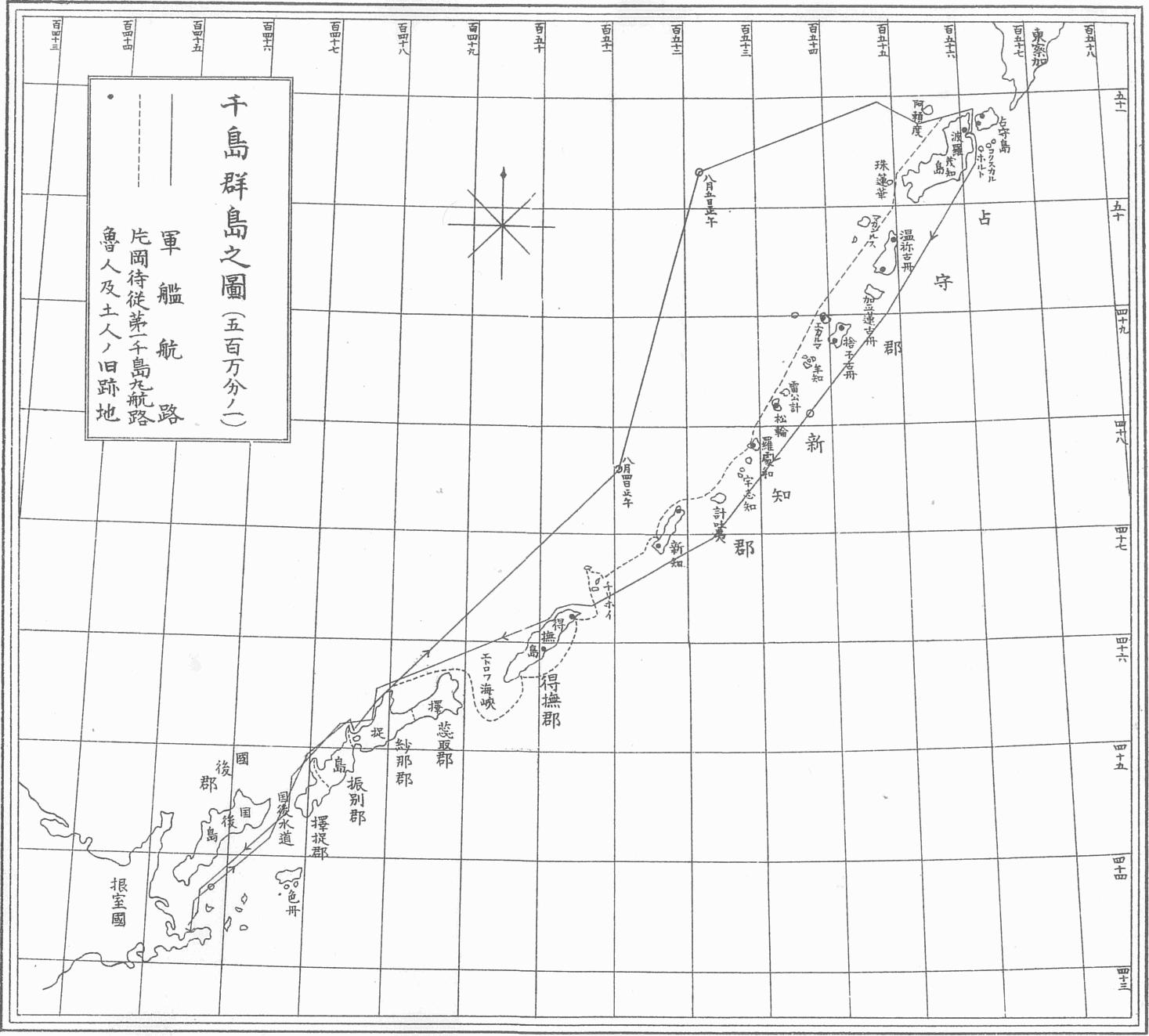
A map of the Kuril Islands from Gisuke Sasamori's 1893 book Chishima Tanken

=== Early history ===
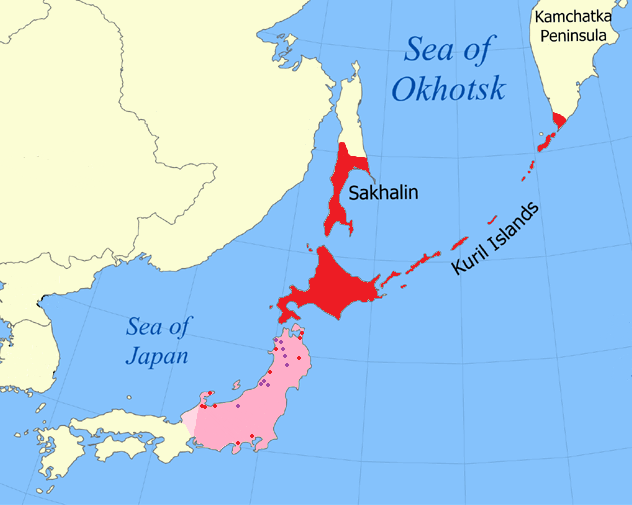
Historical extent of the Ainu

The Ainu people inhabited the Kuril Islands from early times, although few records predate the 17th century. Early Japanese knowledge of the islands came from Ainu informants in the 16th century. The Ainu had traded among themselves for several centuries before either the Japanese or the Russians first appeared. The Menashi Ainu regularly reached Kunashir and Iturup, bringing Japanese goods that eventually circulated northward. In the late 17th and early 18th centuries, the Russians noticed these goods among the indigenous populations of Kamchatka, Shumshu, and Paramushir.

From the Kamakura period to the Muromachi period, there were Ezo (Ainu) people called Hinomoto from the Pacific coast of Hokkaido to the Kuril region, and Mr. Ando, the Ezo Sateshiku and Ezo Kanrei, was in charge of this ("Suwa Daimyojin Ekotoba"). It is said that when turmoil broke out on Ezogashima, he dispatched troops from Tsugaru. Its activities include the Kanto Gomensen, which calls itself the Ando Suigun, and is based in Jusanminato ("Kaisen Shikimoku"), supplying Japanese products to Ezo society and purchasing large quantities of northern products and shipping them nationwide. ("Thirteen Streets"). The Matsumae clan, a feudal lord of Japan, became independent from the Ando clan (the family of Goro Ando).

During the 17th century, Japanese merchants first penetrated the islands, and by the 18th century, the Ainu were subject to the lord of Matsumae. The Shōhō Era Map of Japan (Shōhō kuni ezu (正保国絵図)), a map of Japan made by the Tokugawa shogunate in 1644, shows 39 large and small islands northeast of Hokkaido's Shiretoko Peninsula and Cape Nosappu. A Dutch expedition under Maarten Gerritsz Vries explored the islands in 1643. Fedot Alekseyevich Popov sailed into the area c. 1649. Russian Cossacks landed on Shumshu in 1711.

American whaleships caught right whales off the islands between 1847 and 1892. Three such ships were wrecked on the islands: two on Urup in 1855 and one on Makanrushi in 1856. In September 1892, north of Kunashir Island, a Russian schooner seized the bark Cape Horn Pigeon, of New Bedford, and escorted it to Vladivostok, where it was detained for nearly two weeks.

=== Japanese administration ===
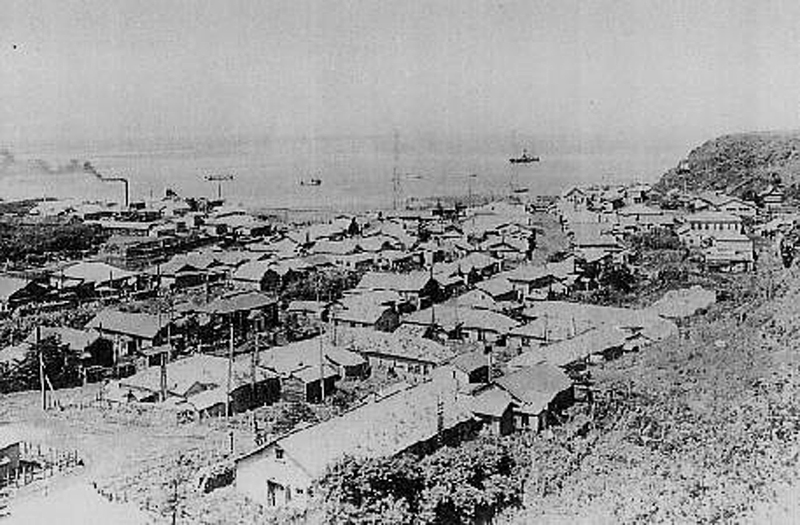
Shana Village in Iturup (Shōwa period): a village hospital in the foreground, a factory in the left background with a fishery and a central radio tower (before 1945).

In the 1875 Treaty of Saint Petersburg, Russia renounced its claims to the Kuril Islands in exchange for Japan renouncing its claims to Sakhalin. The Japanese administration thereafter began to forcefully assimilate the native Ainu people. At the same time, the Ainu were granted automatic Japanese citizenship. Many Japanese moved onto former Ainu lands, including the Kuril Islands. The Ainu were required to adopt Japanese names. Although not compulsory, education was conducted in Japanese. Prior to Japanese colonization, about 10 Ainu reportedly lived on the Kuril Islands in 1868.

=== World War II ===
- In 1941 Admiral Isoroku Yamamoto ordered the assembly of the Imperial Japanese Navy strike-force for the Hawaii Operation attack on Pearl Harbor in Tankan or Hitokappu Bay, Iturup Island, South Kurils. The territory was chosen for its sparse population, lack of foreigners, and constant fog-coverage. The Admiral ordered the move to Hawaii on the morning of 26 November.
- On 10 July 1943 the first bombardment against the Japanese bases in Shumshu and Paramushir by American forces occurred. From Alexai airfield 8 North American B-25 Mitchells from the 77th Bombardment Squadron took off, led by Capt James L. Hudelson. This mission principally struck Paramushir.
- Another mission was flown during 11 September 1943 when the Eleventh Air Force dispatched eight Consolidated B-24 Liberators and 12 B-25s. Facing reinforced Japanese defenses, 74 crew members in three B-24s and seven B-25 failed to return. 22 men were killed in action, one taken prisoner and 51 interned in Kamchatka.
- The Eleventh Air Force implemented other bombing missions against the northern Kurils, including a strike by six B-24s from the 404th Bombardment Squadron and 16 P-38s from the 54th Fighter Squadron on 5 February 1944.
- Japanese sources report that the Matsuwa military installations were subject to American air-strikes between 1943 and 1944.
- The Americans' strategic feint called "Operation Wedlock" diverted Japanese attention north and misled them about the U.S. strategy in the Pacific. The plan included air strikes by the USAAF and U.S. Navy bombers which included U.S. Navy shore bombardment and submarine operations. The Japanese increased their garrison in the north Kurils from 8,000 in 1943 to 41,000 in 1944 and maintained more than 400 aircraft in the Kurils and Hokkaido area in anticipation that the Americans might invade from Alaska.

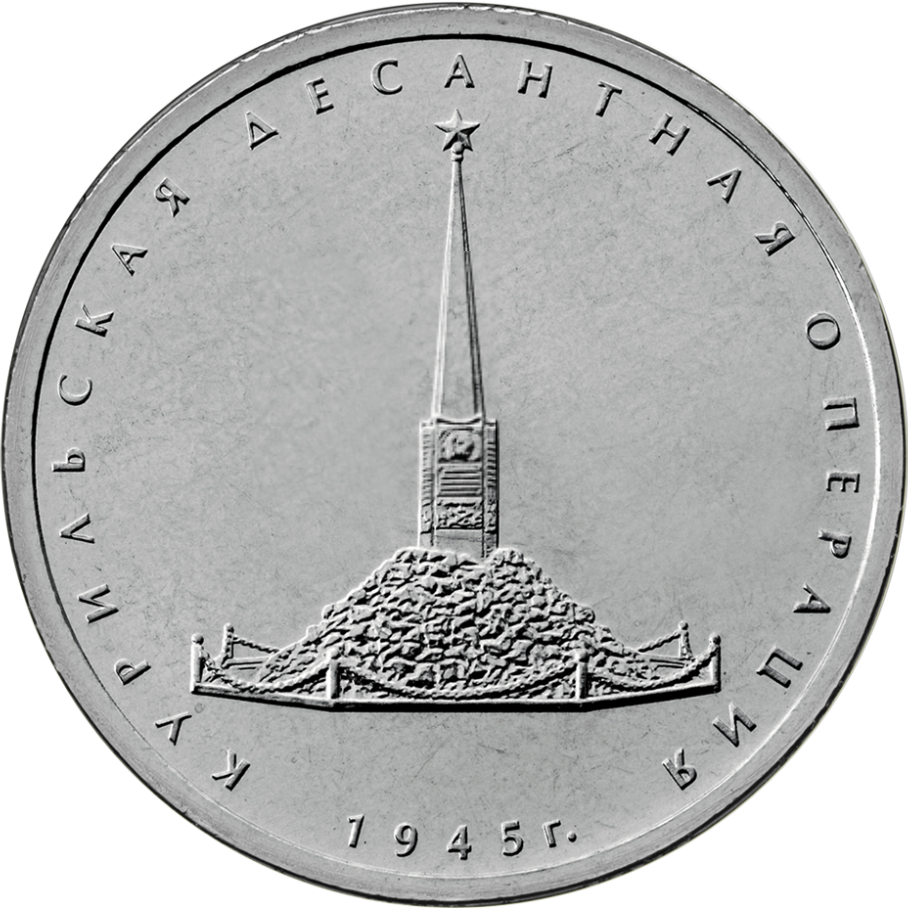
A monument commemorating the Soviet landing depicted on a Russian 5 rouble coin, 2020

- American planners had briefly contemplated an invasion of northern Japan from the Aleutian Islands during the autumn of 1943 but rejected that idea as too risky and impractical. They considered the use of Boeing B-29 Superfortresses, on Amchitka and Shemya bases, but rejected the idea. The U.S. military maintained interest in these plans when they ordered the expansion of bases in the western Aleutians, and major construction began on Shemya. In 1945, plans for a possible invasion of Japan via the northern route were shelved.
- Between 18 and 31 August 1945 Soviet forces invaded the North and South Kurils.
- The Soviets expelled the entire Japanese civilian population of roughly 17,000 by 1946.
- Between 24 August and 4 September 1945 the Eleventh Air Force of the United States Army Air Forces sent two B-24s on reconnaissance missions over the North Kuril Islands with the intention of taking photos of the Soviet occupation in the area. Soviet fighters intercepted and forced them away.

In February 1945 the Yalta Agreement promised to the Soviet Union South Sakhalin and the Kuril Islands in return for entering the Pacific War against the Japanese during World War II. In August 1945 the Soviet Union mounted an armed invasion of South Sakhalin at the cost of over 5,000 Soviet and Japanese lives.

=== Russian administration ===
The Kuril Islands are split into three administrative districts (raions), each a part of Sakhalin Oblast:

- Severo-Kurilsky District (Severo-Kurilsk)
- Kurilsky District (Kurilsk)
- Yuzhno-Kurilsky District (Yuzhno-Kurilsk)

Japan maintains a claim to the three islands of Kunashir, Iturup, and Shikotan, and the Habomai Islands, together called the Northern Territories. In addition, the Japanese government claims that the Kuril Islands, other than the Northern Territories and South Karafuto, are undetermined areas under international law because the San Francisco Peace Treaty does not specify where they belong and the Soviet Union did not sign it.

On 8 February 2017 the Russian government gave names to five previously unnamed Kuril islands in Sakhalin Oblast: Derevyanko Island (after Kuzma Derevyanko, 43°22′8″N 146°1′3″E), Gnechko Island (after Alexey Gnechko, 43°48′5″N 146°52′1″E), Gromyko Island (after Andrei Gromyko, 46°14′1″N 150°36′1″E), Farkhutdinov Island (after Igor Farkhutdinov, 43°48′5″N 146°53′2″E) and Shchetinina Island (after Anna Shchetinina, 46°13′7″N 150°34′6″E).

== Demographics ==
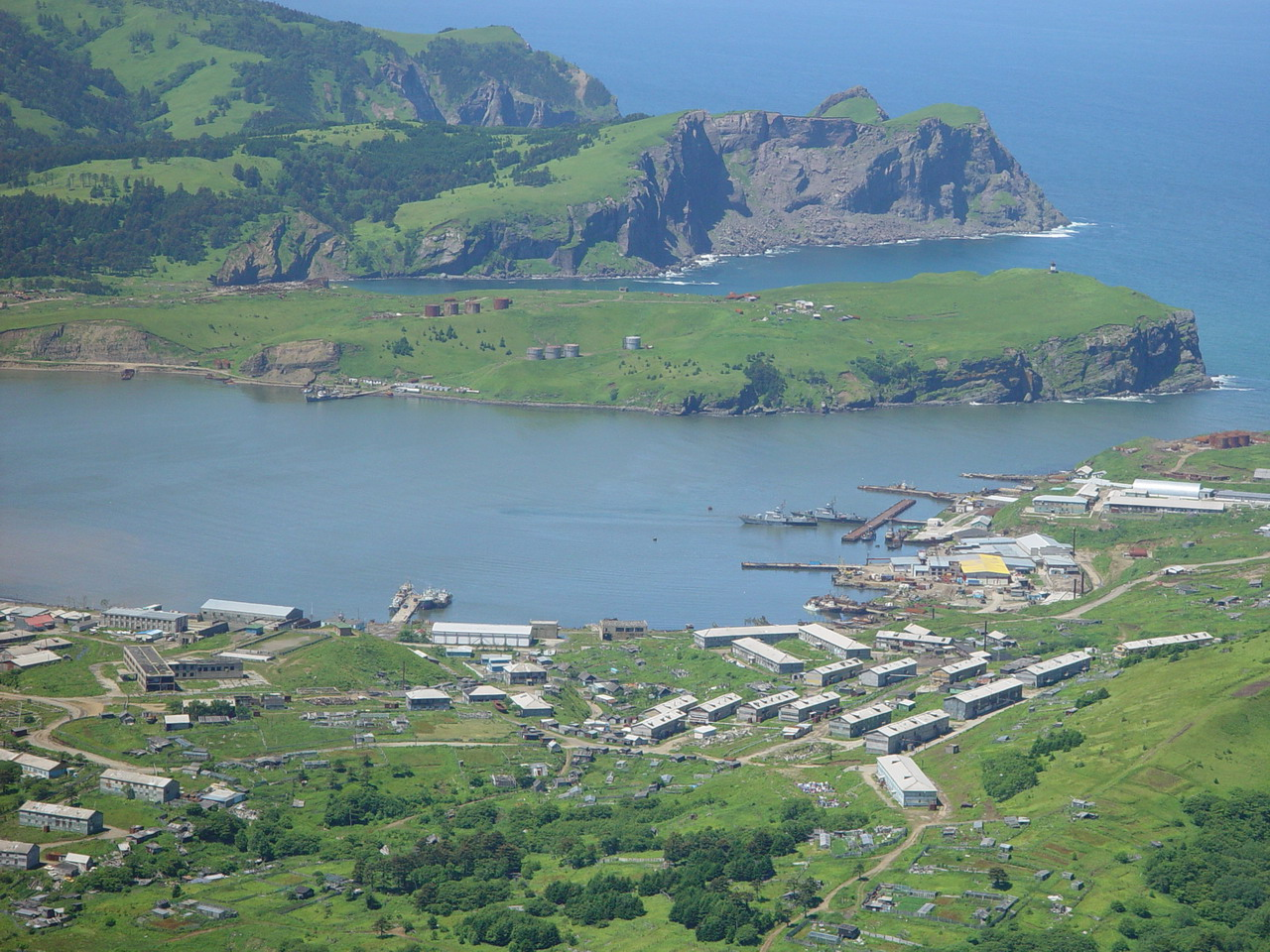
Main village in Shikotan

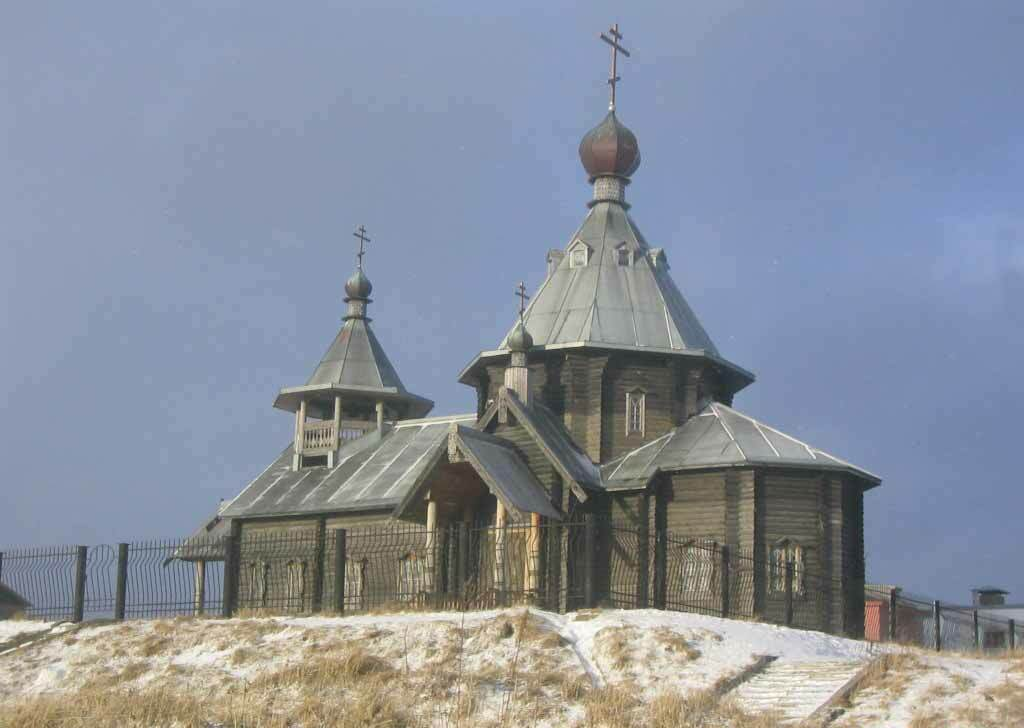
Russian Orthodox church, Kunashir

As of 2013, 19,400 people inhabited the Kuril Islands, of which 16,700 lived on the four disputed southern islands and 2,600 lived on Paramushir, the northernmost large island; the islands in between are uninhabited. These include ethnic Russians, Ukrainians, Belarusians, Tatars, Nivkhs, Oroch, Japanese and Ainus. Russian Orthodox Christianity is the main religion. Some of the villages are permanently occupied by Russian soldiers. Others are inhabited by civilians, who are mostly fishermen, workers in fish factories, dockers, and social sphere workers (police, medics, teachers, etc.). Construction works on the islands have attracted migrant workers from the rest of Russia and other post-Soviet states. As of 2014, there were only 8 inhabited islands out of a total of 56.

== Economy ==
Fishing is the primary occupation. The islands have strategic and economic value, in terms of fisheries and also mineral deposits of pyrite, sulfur, and various polymetallic ores. There are hopes that oil exploration will provide an economic boost to the islands. (Note: "It was hoped that the proceeds from the ongoing projects would help to alleviate the high level of poverty in the region". Eastern Europe, Russia and Central Asia, s.v. Sakhalin Oblast" (Europa Publications) 2003.)

In 2014, construction workers built a pier and a breakwater in Kitovy Bay, central Iturup, where barges are a major means of transport, sailing between the cove and ships anchored offshore. A new road has been carved through the woods near Kurilsk, the island's biggest village, going to the site of Iturup Airport (on Kunashir, the neighboring island south of Iturup, there exists Yuzhno-Kurilsk Mendeleyevo Airport).

Gidrostroy, the Kurils' biggest business group with interests in fishing, construction and real estate, built its second fish processing factory on Iturup island in 2006, introducing a state-of-the-art conveyor system.

To deal with a rise in the demand of electricity, the local government is also upgrading a state-run geothermal power plant at Mount Baransky, an active volcano, where steam and hot water can be found.

In 2022, a special economic zone was established on the Kuril islands with special tax regimes, exemption from corporate income tax, VAT with reduced customs duties for 20 years. It is an important part of Russian government's plan to develop the Russian far east.

== Military ==
The main Russian force stationed on the islands is the 18th Machine Gun Artillery Division, which has its headquarters in Goryachiye Klyuchi on the Iturup Island. There are also Border Guard Service troops stationed on the islands. In February 2011, Russian President Dmitry Medvedev called for substantial reinforcements of the Kuril Islands defences. Subsequently, in 2015, additional anti-aircraft missile systems Tor and Buk, coastal defence missile system Bastion, Kamov Ka-52 combat helicopters and one Varshavyanka project submarine came on defence of Kuril Islands. During the 2022 Russian Invasion of Ukraine, it was reported that parts of the 18th Machine Gun Artillery Division were redeployed to Eastern Ukraine.

== List of main islands ==
While in Russian sources the islands are mentioned for the first time in 1646, the earliest detailed information about them was provided by the explorer Vladimir Atlasov in 1697. In the 18th and early 19th centuries, the Kuril Islands were explored by: Danila Antsiferov, I. Kozyrevsky, Ivan Yevreinov, Fyodor Luzhin, Martin Spanberg, Adam Johann von Krusenstern, Vasily Golovnin, and Henry James Snow.

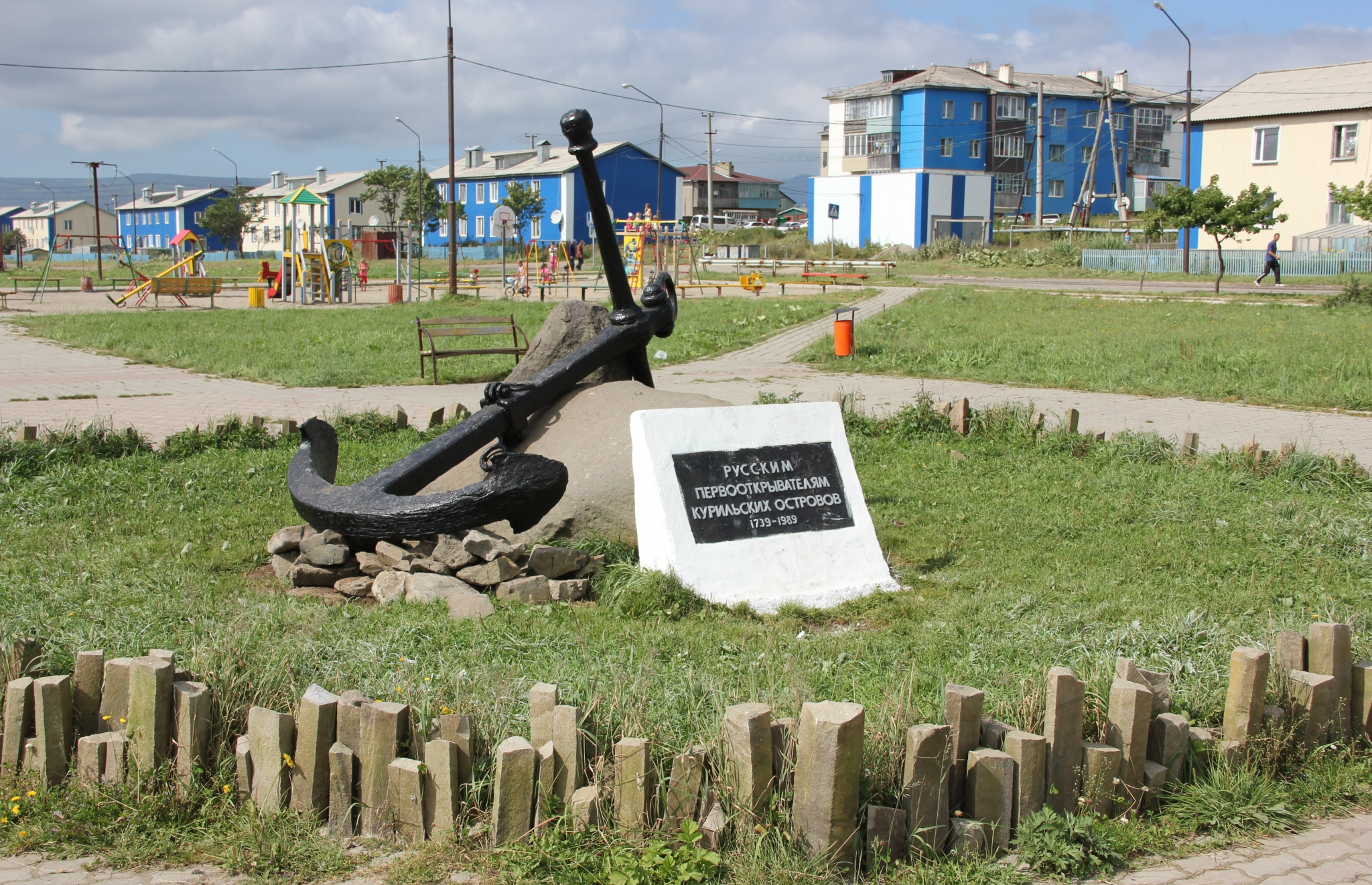
Yuzhno-Kurilsk, Kunashir

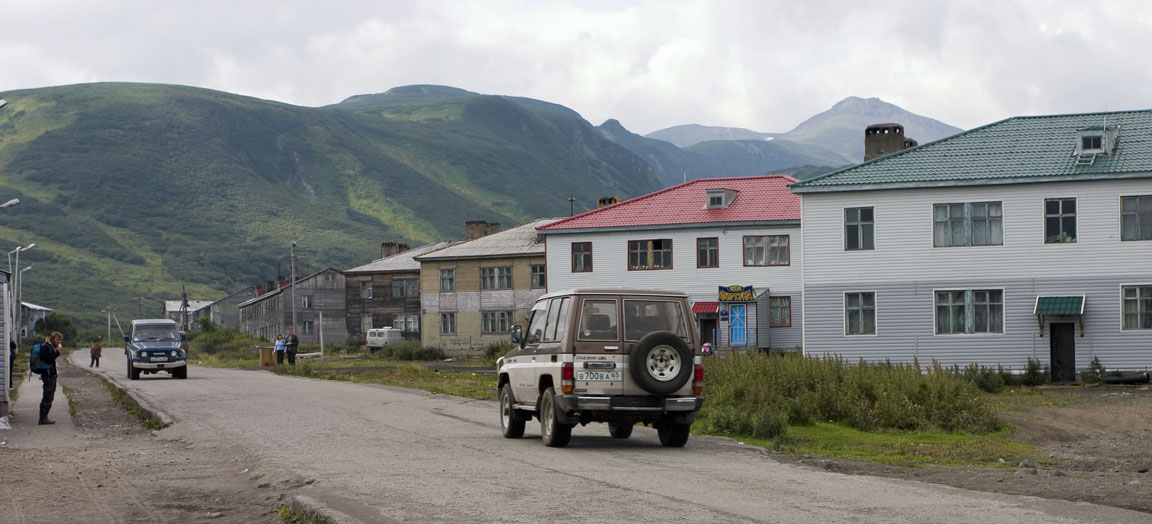
Severo-Kurilsk, Paramushir

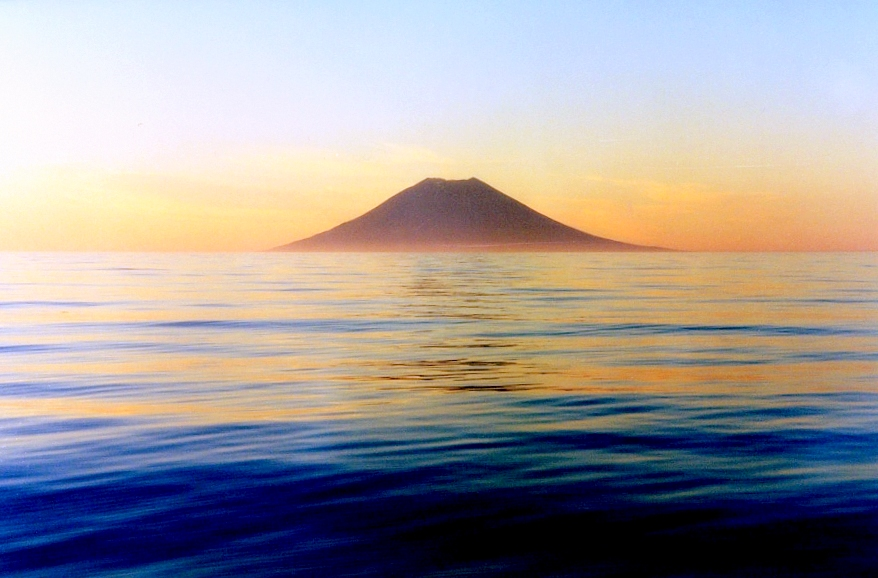
Atlasov

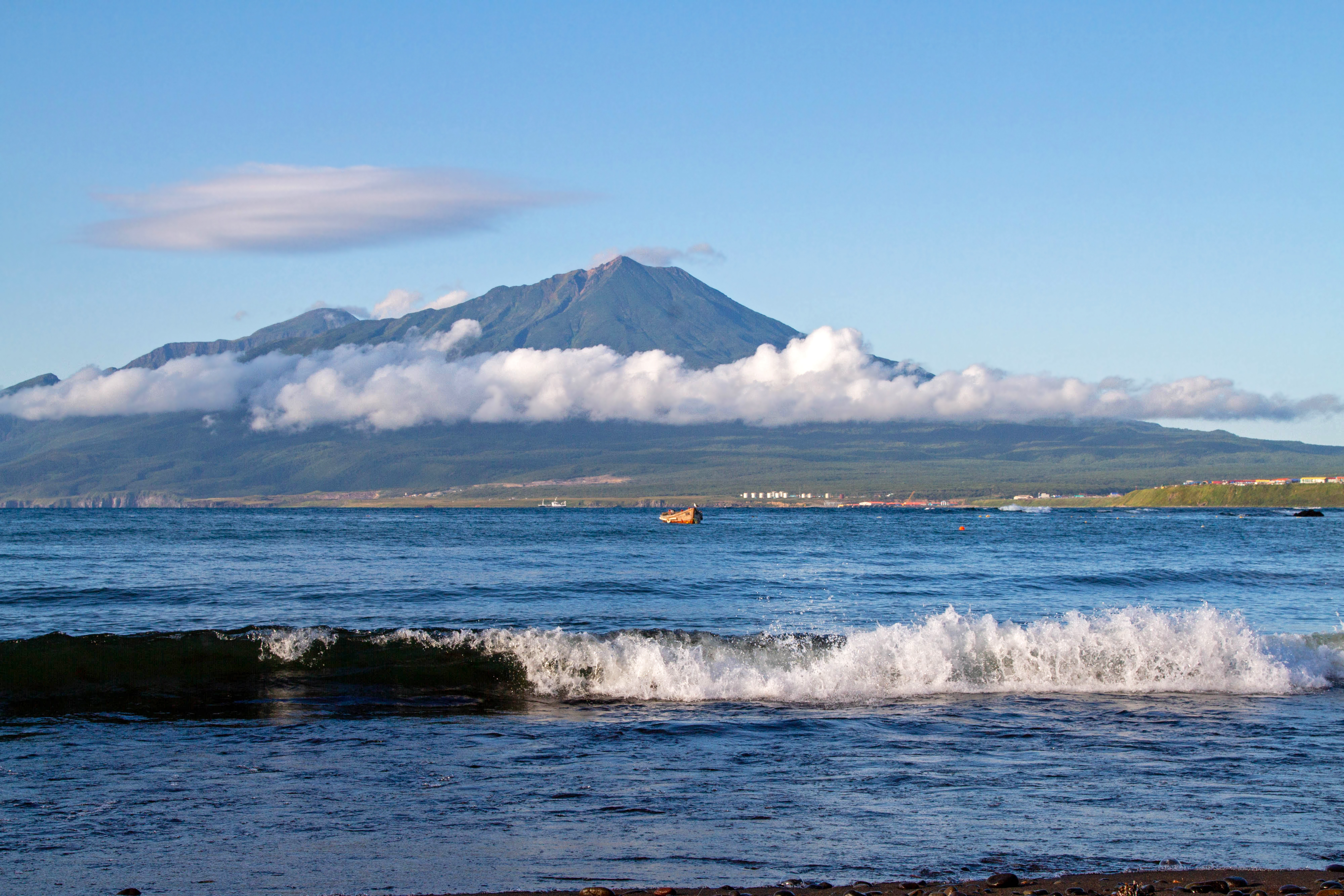
A view of the volcano Bogdan Khmelnitsky on Iturup Island

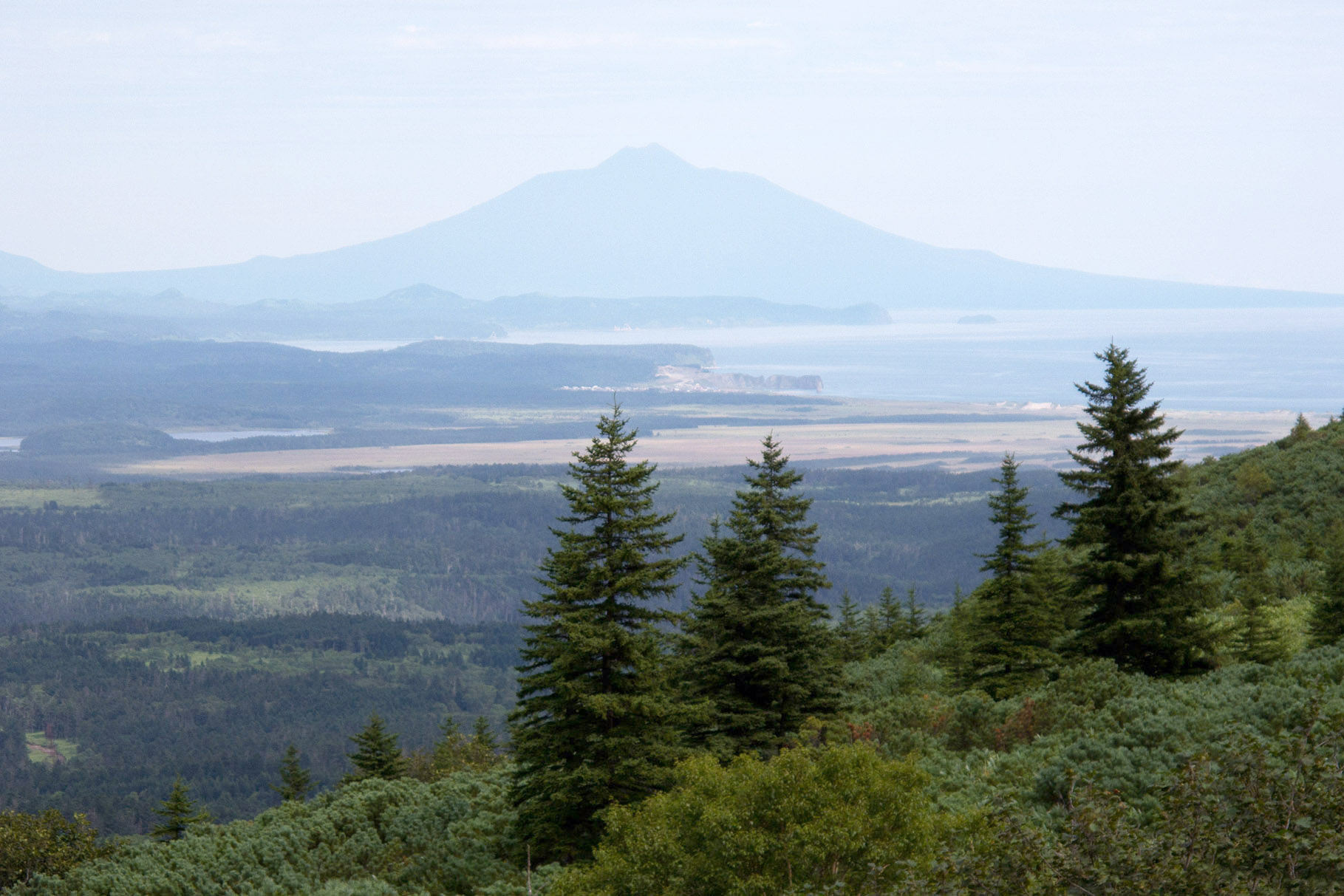
Mendeleyeva in the southern part of Kunashir

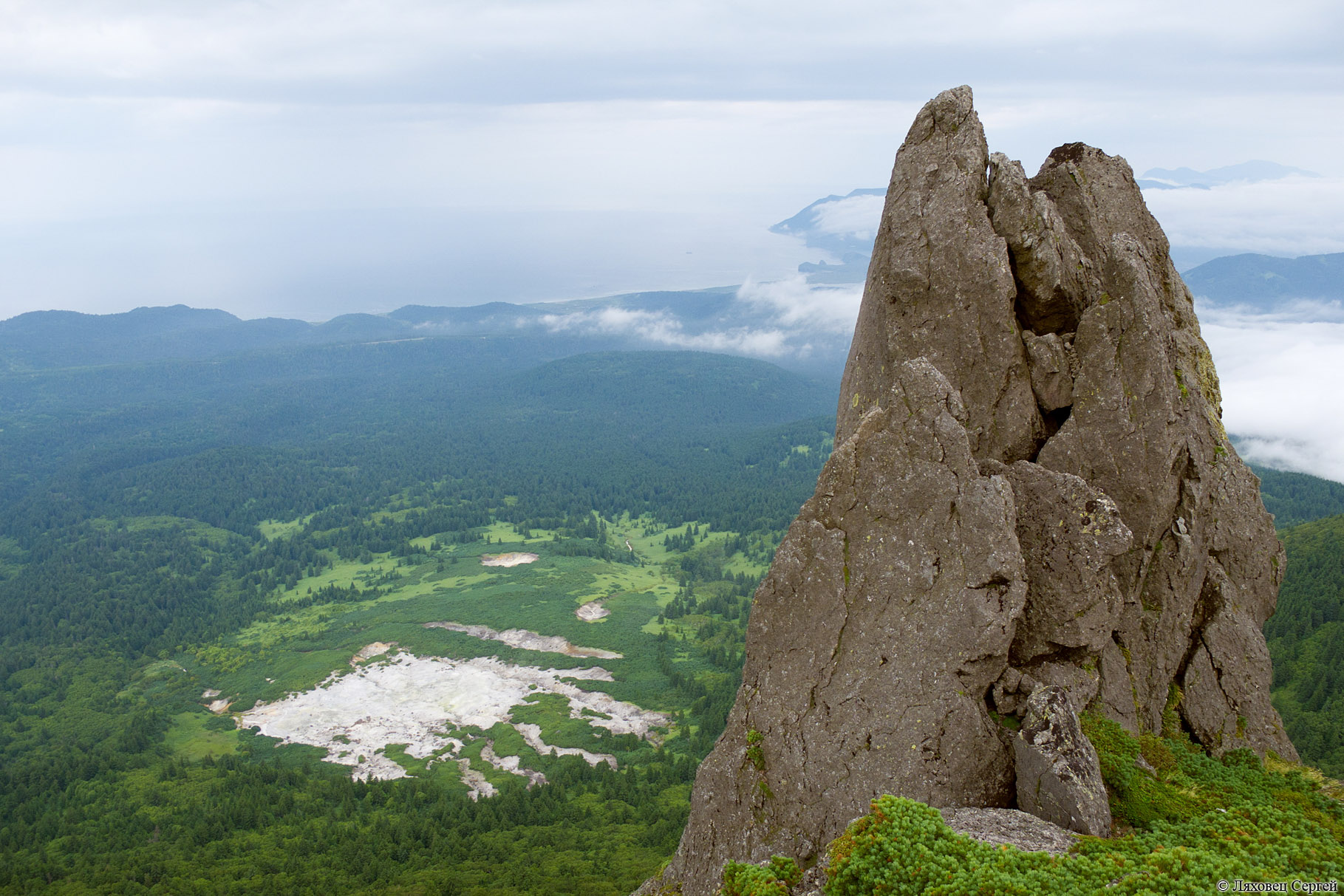
Yuzhno-Kurilsky District

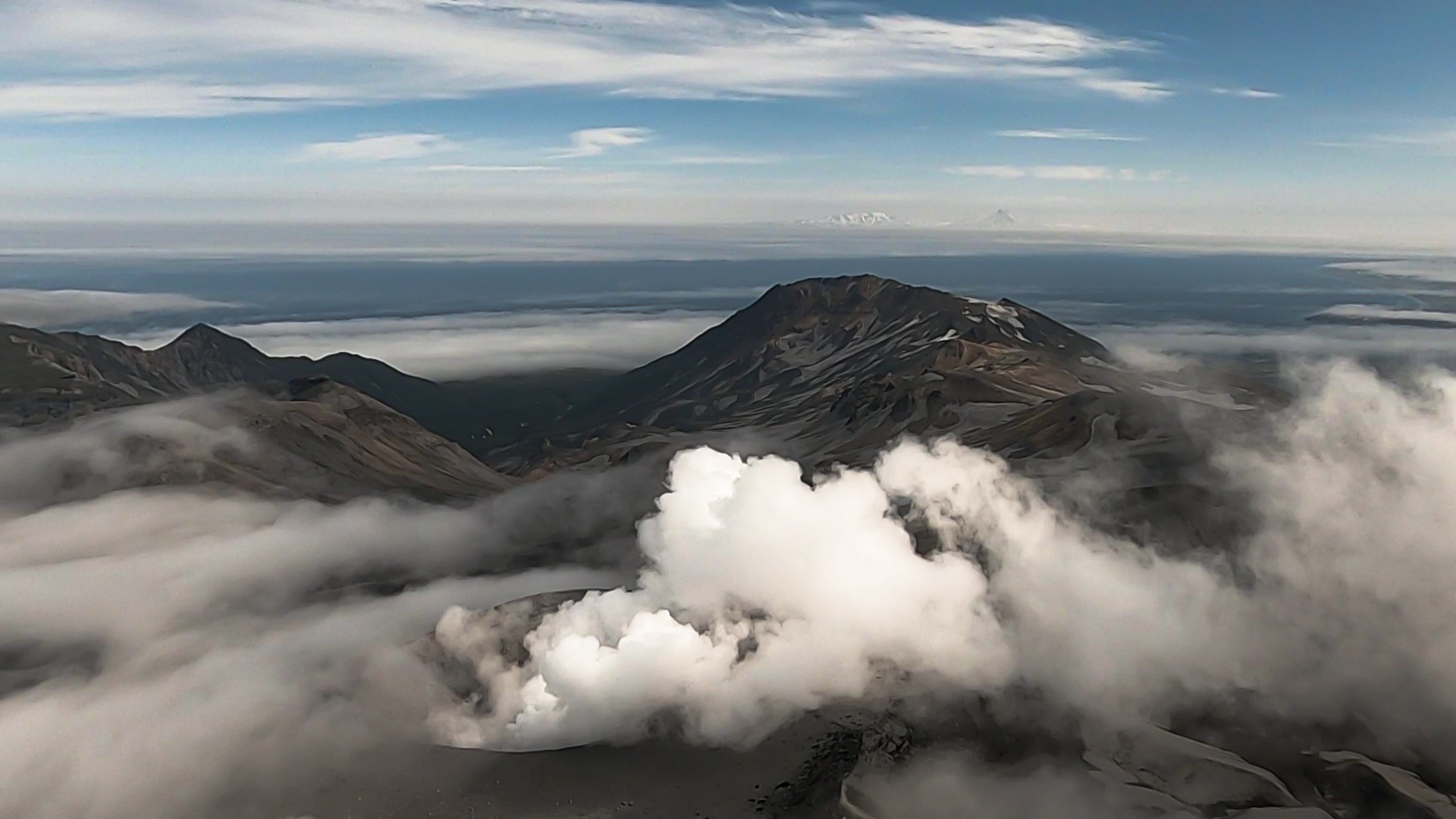
Ebeko volcano, Paramushir

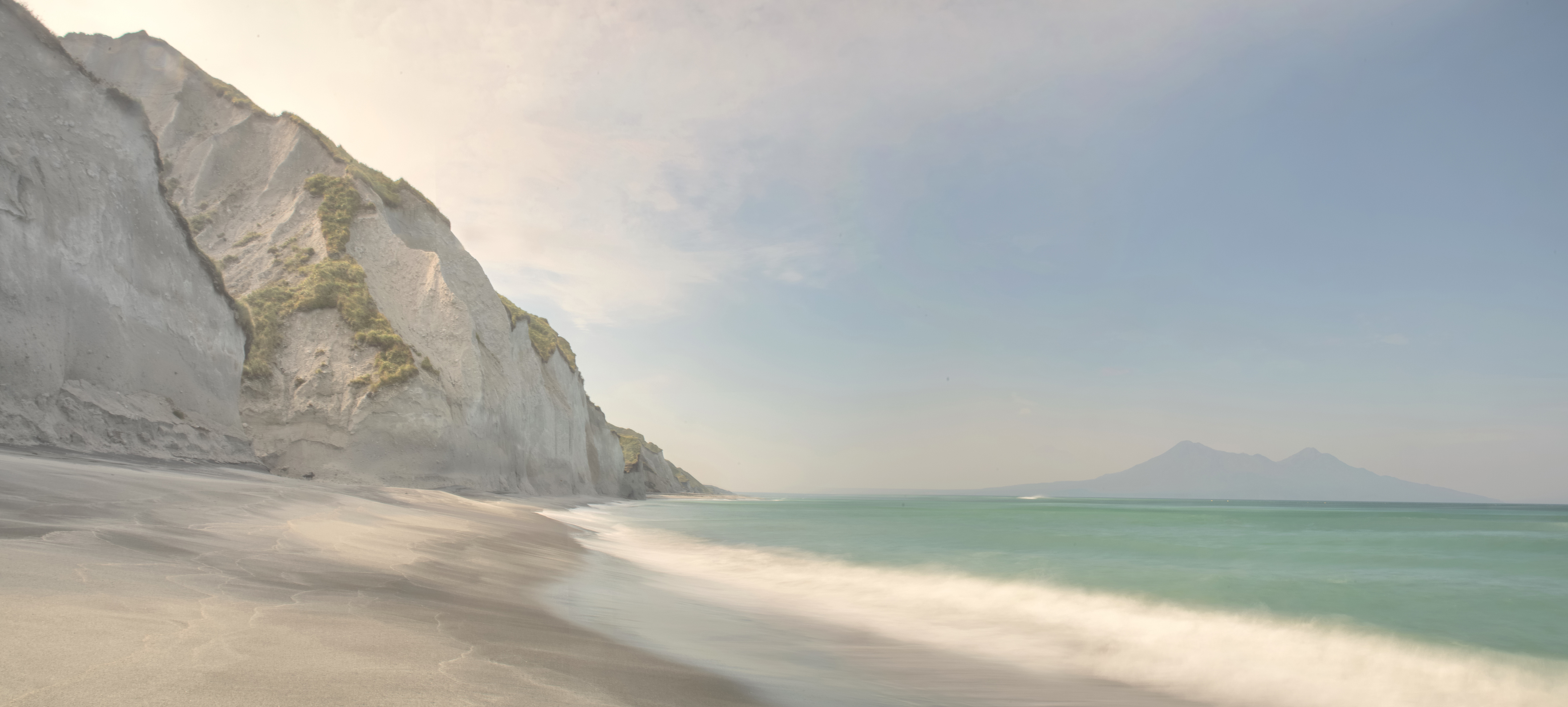
White Rocks, Iturup

The following table lists information on the main islands from north to south: (Note: In the Greater/ Lesser Kuril Chain designations, the former is the 'Inner' chain and broadly comprises the islands from Atlasov to Kunashir (thus including two of the South Kurils as set out here) and the latter forms a relatively short 'Outer' chain close to the Nemuro Peninsula of Hokkaido and extends to Shikotan.)

Island	Russian name	Japanese name	Ainu name	Island Group	Administrative centre / Landing point	Other settlements	Area	Pop.
Severo-Kurilsky District				North Kurils (Kita-chishima / 北千島)	Severo-Kurilsk	Shelikovo, Podgorny, Baikovo	3,504 km^{2} (1,353 sq mi)	2,560
Shumshu	Шумшу	占守島(しゅむしゅとう) Shumushu-tō	*Sumusu	North Kurils	Baikovo		388 km^{2} (150 sq mi)	20
Atlasov	Атласова	阿頼度島(あらいどとう) Araido-tō	Oyakopa [Oyakoba]	North Kurils	Alaidskaya Bay		150 km^{2} (58 sq mi)	0
Paramushir	Парамушир	幌筵島(ぱらむしるとう) Paramushiru-tō, Horomushiro-tō	Paramusir	North Kurils	Severo-Kurilsk	Shelikovo, Podgorny	2,053 km^{2} (793 sq mi)	2,540
Antsiferov	Анциферова	志林規島(しりんきとう) Shirinki-tō	Sirinki	North Kurils	Antsiferov beach	Cape Terkut	7 km^{2} (2.7 sq mi)	0
Makanrushi	Маканруши	磨勘留島(まかんるとう) Makanru-tō	[uncertain]	North Kurils	Zakat		50 km^{2} (19 sq mi)	0
Awos	Авось Avosʹ	帆掛岩(ほかけいわ) Hokake-iwa	Hainoko	North Kurils			0.1 km^{2} (0.039 sq mi)	0
Onekotan	Онекотан	温禰古丹島(おんねこたんとう) Onnekotan-tō	Onekotan	North Kurils	Mussel	Kuroisi, Nemo, Shestakov	425 km^{2} (164 sq mi)	0
Harimkotan	Харимкотан Kharimkotan	春牟古丹島(はりむこたんとう) Harimukotan-tō, Harumukotan-tō	Harimkotan, Haruomakotan, Karinkotan	North Kurils	Sunazhma	Severgin Bay	70 km^{2} (27 sq mi)	0
Ekarma	Экарма	越渇磨島(えかるまとう) Ekaruma-tō	Ekarmausi	North Kurils	Kruglyy		30 km^{2} (12 sq mi)	0
Chirinkotan	Чиринкотан	知林古丹島(ちりんこたんとう) Chirinkotan-tō	Cirinkotan	North Kurils	Cape Ptichy		6 km^{2} (2.3 sq mi)	0
Shiashkotan	Шиашкотан	捨子古丹島(しゃすこたんとう) Shasukotan-tō	*Siaskotan	North Kurils	Makarovka		122 km^{2} (47 sq mi)	0
Lowuschki Rocks (Lowuschki-Felsen)	Ловушки Lovushki	牟知列岩(むしるれつがん) Mushiru-retsugan	Musir	North Kurils			1.5 km^{2} (0.58 sq mi)	0
Raikoke	Райкоке	雷公計島(らいこけとう) Raikoke-tō	Raikoke	North Kurils	Raikoke		4.6 km^{2} (1.8 sq mi)	0
Matua	Матуа	松輪島(まつわとう) Matsuwa-tō	Matua	North Kurils	Sarychevo		52 km^{2} (20 sq mi)	0
Rasshua	Расшуа	羅処和島(らしょわとう) Rashowa-tō	uncertain; thought to be Rusoa and Ruskorke	North Kurils	Arches Point		67 km^{2} (26 sq mi)	0
Srednii	Среднего Srednego	摺手岩(すりでいわ) Suride-iwa	Kankan-kaipe	North Kurils			0.02 km^{2} (0.0077 sq mi)	0
Ushishir	Ушишир	宇志知島(うししるとう) Ushishiru-tō	Ushishir	North Kurils	Kraternya	Ryponkicha	5 km^{2} (1.9 sq mi)	0
Ketoy	Кетой	計吐夷島(けといとう) Ketoi-tō	uncertain; possibly Keutoi	North Kurils	Storozheva		73 km^{2} (28 sq mi)	0
Kurilsky District				Middle Kurils (Naka-chishima / 中千島), split between the island groups	Kurilsk	Reidovo, Kitovyi, Rybaki, Goryachiye Klyuchi, Kasatka, Burevestnik, Shumi-Gorodok, Gornyy	5,138 km^{2} (1,984 sq mi)	6,606
Simushir	Симушир	新知島(しむしるとう) Shimushiru-tō, Shinshiru-tō		North Kurils	Kraternyy	Srednaya bay	360 km^{2} (140 sq mi)	0
Broutona	Броутона	武魯頓島(ぶろとんとう) Buroton-tō	Makanrur	North Kurils	Nedostupnyy		7 km^{2} (2.7 sq mi)	0
Chirpoy	Чирпой	知理保以島(ちりほいとう) Chirihoi-tō, Cherupoi-tō		North Kurils	Peschanaya Bay		21 km^{2} (8.1 sq mi)	0
Brat Chirpoyev	Брат Чирпоев	知理保以南島(ちりほいみなみとう) Chirihoi-minami-jima, Cherupoi-minami-tō		North Kurils	Garovnikova	Semenova	16 km^{2} (6.2 sq mi)	0
Urup	Уруп	得撫島(うるっぷとう) Uruppu-tō		North Kurils	Mys Kastrikum	Mys Van-der-Lind	1,450 km^{2} (560 sq mi)	0
Other				North Kurils			4.4 km^{2} (1.7 sq mi)	0
Iturup	Итуруп	択捉島(えとろふとう) Etorofu-tō		South Kurils (Minami-chishima / 南千島)	Kurilsk	Reidovo, Kitovyi, Rybaki, Goryachiye Klyuchi, Kasatka, Burevestnik, Shumi-Gorodok, Gornyy	3,280 km^{2} (1,270 sq mi)	6,602
Yuzhno-Kurilsky District				South Kurils	Yuzhno-Kurilsk	Malokurilskoye, Rudnaya, Lagunnoye, Otrada, Goryachiy Plyazh, Aliger, Mendeleyevo, Dubovoye, Polino, Golovnino	1,860.8 km^{2} (718.5 sq mi)	10,268
Kunashir	Кунашир	国後島(くなしりとう) Kunashiri-tō		South Kurils	Yuzhno-Kurilsk	Rudnaya, Lagunnoye, Otrada, Goryachiy Plyazh, Aliger, Mendeleyevo, Dubovoye, Polino, Golovnino	1,499 km^{2} (579 sq mi)	7,800
Shikotan	Шикотан	色丹島(しこたんとう) Shikotan-tō		South Kurils	Malokurilskoye	Dumnova, Otradnaya, Krabozavodskoye (formerly Anama), Zvezdnaya, Voloshina, Kray Sveta	255 km^{2} (98 sq mi)	2,440
Other				South Kurils		Ayvazovskovo	9.1 km^{2} (3.5 sq mi)	0
Habomai	Хабомаи Khabomai	歯舞群島(はぼまいぐんとう) Habomai-guntō	Hapomai [Habomai]	South Kurils	Zorkiy	Zelyony, Polonskogo	97.7 km^{2} (37.7 sq mi)	28
Polonsky	Полонского	多楽島(たらくとう) Taraku-tō		South Kurils	Moriakov Bay station		11.57 km^{2} (4.47 sq mi)	2
Oskolki	Осколки	海馬島(かいばとう) Kaiba-tō, Todo-jima	Toto-musir [Todo-mushir]	South Kurils			Unknown	0
Zeleny	Зелёный Zelyonyy	志発島(しぼつとう) Shibotsu-tō		South Kurils	Glushnevskyi station		58.72 km^{2} (22.67 sq mi)	3
Dyomin	Харкар Kharkar	春苅島(はるかるとう) Harukaru-tō	Harkar-kotan, Harkar-musir	South Kurils	Haruka		0.8 km^{2} (0.31 sq mi)	0
Yuri	Юрий Yuriy	勇留島(ゆりとう) Yuri-tō	Uriru or Yuwaro	South Kurils	Kalernaya		10.32 km^{2} (3.98 sq mi)	0
Anuchin	Анучина Anuchina	秋勇留島(あきゆりとう) Akiyuri-tō		South Kurils	Bolshoye Bay		2.35 km^{2} (0.91 sq mi)	0
Tanfilyev	Танфильев Tanfilʹev	水晶島(すいしょうじま) Suishō-jima		South Kurils	Zorkiy	Tanfilyevka Bay, Bolotnoye	12.92 km^{2} (4.99 sq mi)	23
Moemoshiri	Сторожевой Storozhevoy	萌茂尻島(もえもしりとう) Moemoshiri-tō		South Kurils			0.07 km^{2} (0.027 sq mi)	0
Odoke	Рифовый Rifovyy	オドケ島 Odoke-tō		South Kurils			0.0025 km^{2} (0.00097 sq mi)	0
Kaigara	Сигнальный Signalʹnyy	貝殻島(かいがらじま) Kaigara-jima	Kaikarai	South Kurils			0.02 km^{2} (0.0077 sq mi)	0
Other				South Kurils		Opasnaya, Udivitelnaya	1 km^{2} (0.39 sq mi)	0
Total:							10,503.2 km^{2} (4,055.3 sq mi)	19,434

== See also ==
- 2006 Kuril Islands earthquake
- 2007 Kuril Islands earthquake
- Chishima Province
- Evacuation of Karafuto and Kuriles
- Invasion of the Kuril Islands
- Karafuto Fortress
- Karafuto Prefecture
- Organization of Hokkai (North) Army
- Organization of Kita and Minami Fortresses
- Political divisions of Karafuto Prefecture
- Zemlyak
