= 68th Guards Army Corps =

Russian Ground Forces formation

68th Army Corps
- Active: 1993–2010; 2014–present
- Country: Russia
- Branch: Russian Ground Forces
- Part of: Eastern Military District
- Garrison/HQ: Yuzhno-Sakhalinsk

Commanders
- Current commander: Lieutenant General Dmitry Glushenkov
- Notable commanders: Major General Valery Asapov

The 68th Guards Army Corps (Russian: 68-й гвардейский армейский корпус) is an army corps of the Russian Ground Forces' Eastern Military District, stationed in Sakhalin and the Kuril Islands, with its headquarters at Yuzhno-Sakhalinsk. The corps was first formed in 1993 from the 51st Army and disbanded in 2010. It was reformed in 2014.

== History ==
The 68th Army Corps was first formed on 11 October 1993 from the 51st Army at Yuzhno-Sakhalinsk, part of the Far Eastern Military District. It included the 33rd Motor Rifle Division at Khomutovo, the 18th Machine Gun Artillery Division at Goryachiye Klyuchi, and the 31st Anti-Aircraft Rocket Brigade at Yuzhno-Sakhalinsk. In 1997, its commander, Lieutenant General Gennady Anoshin, died of heart failure on a plane flight just before he was scheduled to retire from active duty. In 2002, the 31st Brigade was disbanded. Sources differ on the date of the corps' disbandment. According to Aleksey Gayday, in Russia's New Army, the corps was disbanded on 1 December 2006. A 2014 news report cited the date of the corps' disbandment as 2010. On 1 June 2009, as part of the reform of the Russian Armed Forces, the 33rd Division was downsized into the 39th Separate Motor Rifle Brigade.

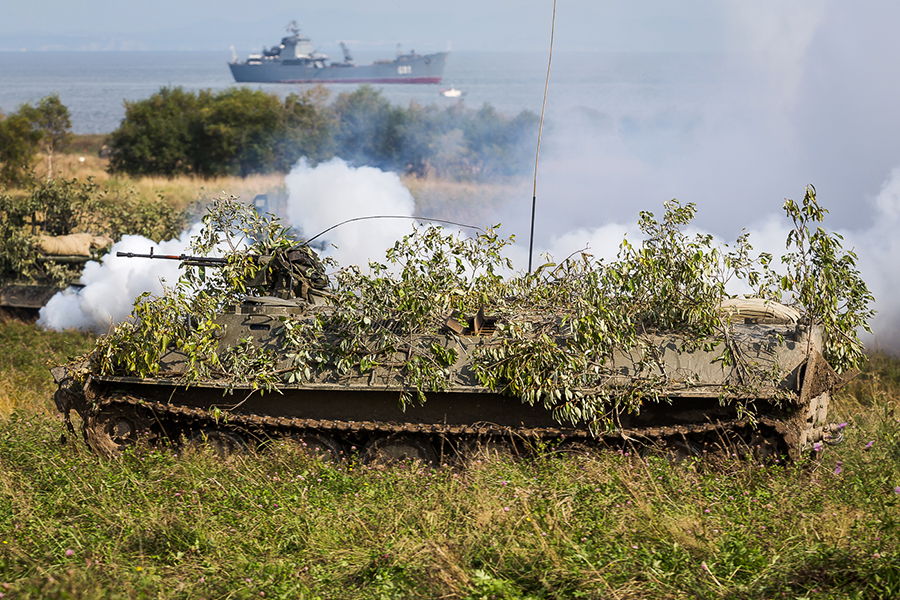
A MT-LB of the 39th Motor Rifle Brigade during Exercise "Vostok-2014" on Sakhalin

In April 2014, the corps was reinstated on the basis the units already stationed in Sakhalin and the Kuril Islands: the 18th Machine Gun Artillery Division and the 39th Separate Motor Rifle Brigade, under the command of Major General Valery Asapov. The 676th Separate Engineer Battalion was formed later that year. In July 2015, Major General Alexander Peryazev took command after Asapov transferred to the Southern Military District. and, according to Main Directorate of Intelligence of the Ministry of Defence of Ukraine as well as other sources, under the alias of "Primakov" participated in the Russian military intervention in Ukraine as commander of the Donetsk People's Republic's 1st Army Corps. The corps moved to a full contract manning system from August 2016. In February 2017, Major General Dmitry Glushenkov became commander of the corps, replacing Peryazev, who became commander of the 20th Guards Army.

== Role in the Russian invasion of Ukraine ==
In the context of the Russian invasion of Ukraine, elements of the 68th Army Corps (including units from the 18th Machine Gun Artillery Division and 39th Separate Red Banner Motor Rifle Brigade) had been deployed to Belarus and were participating in active combat operations. On 16 April 2025 the unit was awarded the "Guards" title.

== Organisation ==
In 2019 the corps structure was altered into the following:

- 137th Separate Headquarters Battalion, Yuzhno-Sakhalinsk
- 1336th Command and Intelligence Centre, Yuzhno-Sakhalinsk
- 327th Separate Electronic Warfare Battalion, Dachnoe
- 39th Separate Red Banner Motor Rifle Brigade, в/ч 35390 Yuzhno-Sakhalinsk
- 18th Machine Gun Artillery Division, в/ч 05812 Goryachy Klyuch
  - 46th Machine Gun Artillery Regiment в/ч 71435
  - 49th Machine Gun Artillery Regiment в/ч 71439
- 312th Separate Rocket Artillery Battalion, Dachnoe
- 431st Air Defence Command Post, Yuzhno-Sakhalinsk
- 676th Separate Engineering Battalion, Dachnoe

== Commanders ==
- Major General Valery Grigoryevich Asapov (January 2014 – July 2015)
- Major General Alexandr Vasilyevich Peryazev (July 2015 – February 2017)
- Major General Dmitry Valeryevich Glushenkov (February 2017 – present)
