= Luzhin =

Luzhin (Russian: Лужин) is a Russian family name, derived from the word luzha, "puddle". Its feminine counterpart is Luzhina. It may refer to:

- Fyodor Luzhin (died 1727), Russian geodesist and cartographer
  - Luzhin Strait within Kuril Islands, named after Fyodor Luzhin
- Larisa Luzhina (born 1939), Russian actress

== See also ==
- The Luzhin Defence
