= Fyodor Luzhin =

Russian geodesist and cartographer (died 1727)

Fyodor Fyodorovich Luzhin (Russian: Федор Федорович Лужин; died 1727) was a Russian geodesist and cartographer. During the reign of Peter the Great, he was sent to explore and map the Kuril Islands.

== Life ==
Fyodor Luzhin was first a student at the School for Mathematical and Navigational Sciences in Moscow and then in a geodesic class of the Naval Academy in St. Petersburg (until 1718). In 1719–1721, Luzhin took part in drawing a map of Kamchatka and the Kuril Islands together with Ivan Yevreinov. In 1723–1724, he made surveys of different parts of East Siberia. In 1725–1727, Luzhin participated in the First Kamchatka Expedition led by Vitus Bering.

== Honors ==
Luzhin Bay in Magadan Oblast, and Luzhin Strait which separates Antsiferov Island from the Paramushir coast are both named after him.
