= Ivan Yevreinov =

Russian explorer (1694–1724)

Ivan Mikhaylovich Yevreinov (Russian: Ива́н Миха́йлович Евре́инов; 1694 – 3 February O.S. 1724) was a Russian geodesist and explorer.

== Life ==
Ivan Yevreinov was born in Poland, then brought to Russia and baptized into Orthodox Christianity.

Ivan Yevreinov was first a student at the Moscow School of Mathematics and Navigation (from 1714) and then in a geodesic class of the Naval Academy in St. Petersburg. In 1719, Ivan Yevreinov was sent to Kamchatka and Kuril Islands by the order of Peter the Great to secretly perform cartography together with Fyodor Luzhin and find if America and Asia are joined.

In 1720, he reached Okhotsk by land (through Siberia), then on a small ship Vostok he reached Kamchatka, then by land traveled to Nizhnekamchatsk (and was the first to measure geographical coordinates of this place). He returned to the ship, mapped the shores of Kamchatka, then sailed to the south along Kuril Islands (was first to map sixteen of Kuril Islands) down to Hokkaidō. On the Kuril Islands they collected taxes from the local population, then through Kamchatka, Okhotsk and Yakutsk they returned to Tobolsk and finally to Kazan, there Ivan reported about his findings to Peter the Great. Ivan Evreinov was not able to answer whether America and Asia are connected by land, but he was first to make accurate mapping of Kamchatka, Kuril Islands and Russian Pacific Coast, before him even coordinates of local forts and villages were not known.

Since 1723 he worked on mapping Khlynov and surroundings and died there.

Name of Evreinov is given to a Mountain and a Peninsula on Okhotsk Sea and one of the straits between Kuril Islands.
