= Malokurilskoye =

Malokurilskoye Малокурильское
- Selo
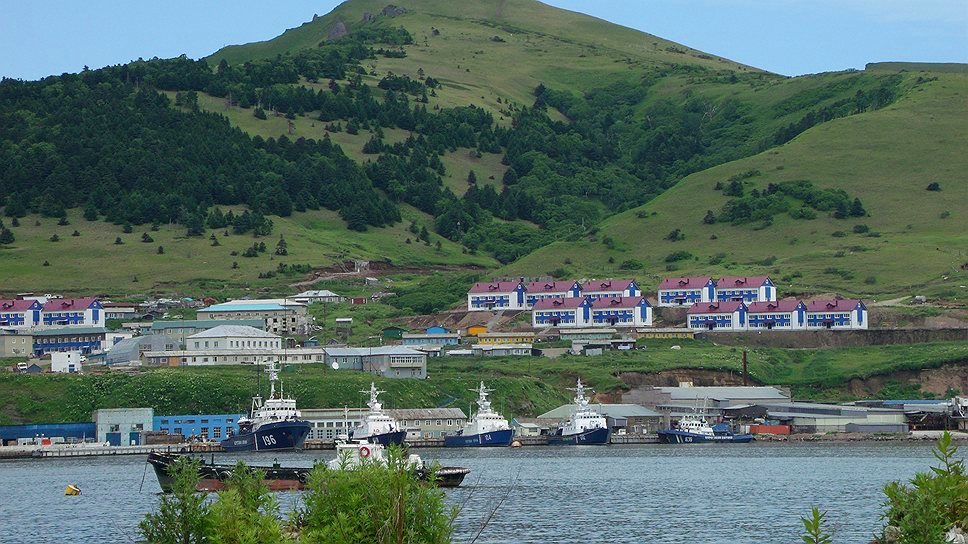
- Port of Malokurilskoye in 2015
- Interactive map of Malokurilskoye
- Location of Malokurilskoye Malokurilskoye (Sakhalin Oblast)
- Coordinates: 43°52′14″N 146°49′40″E
- Country: Russia
- Federal subject: Sakhalin Oblast
- Administrative district: Yuzhno-Kurilsky District
- Founded: 1933
- Elevation: 36 m (118 ft)

Population (2010 Census)
  - Total: 1,873
  - Estimate (2021): 2,285 (+22%)
- Time zone: UTC+11 (MSK+8)
- Postal code: 694500–694529
- Dialing code: +7 42455
- OKTMO ID: 64756000146

Malokurilskoye (Russian: Малокури́льское) is a village (selo) on Shikotan island in Yuzhno-Kurilsky District, Sakhalin Oblast, Russia. Population: 1,100 (2007), 1,873 (2010).

Ostrovnoy canning factory is the main employer in the village.

== Landmarks ==
In 2005, on the 60th anniversary of the Soviet Annexation of the Kuril Islands at the end of World War 2, an IS-2 tank was installed.

== Transportation ==
Malokurilskoye is connected by a 9 km-long (5.6 mi) road with the village of Krabozavodskoye. On January 1, 2016, for the first time in the history of the island, public transport began to operate on it - the bus "s.Krabozavodskoye - Malokurilskoye." The route is served by two PAZ buses owned by Shikotansky Vodokanal LLC.

== Gallery ==
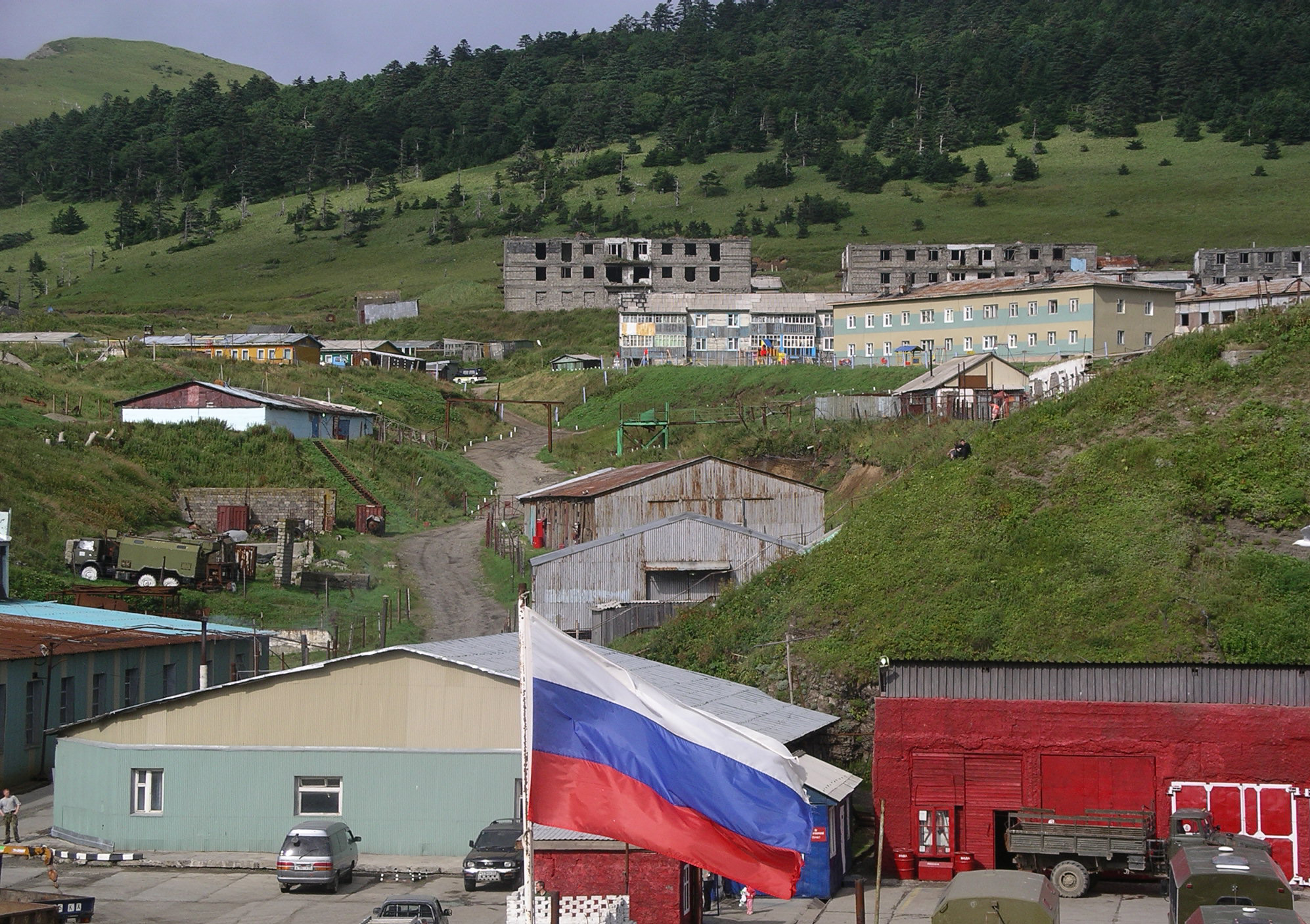
View of Malokurilskoye on April 24, 2007
