= Goryachiye Klyuchi =

Goryachiye Klyuchi (Russian: Горячие Ключи) is the name of several rural localities in Sakhalin Oblast, Russia:

- Goryachiye Klyuchi, Kurilsky District, Sakhalin Oblast, a selo in Kurilsky District
- Goryachiye Klyuchi, Nogliksky District, Sakhalin Oblast, a selo in Nogliksky District
