= 18th Machine Gun Artillery Division =

184th Rifle Division (II) (1941–1946) 18th Machine Gun Artillery Division (1946–1949; 1978–present)
- Active: 1941–1949; 1978–present
- Country: Soviet Union (1941–1991); Russia (1991-present)
- Branch: Russian Ground Forces
- Type: Fortification Artillery
- Part of: 68th Army Corps, Eastern Military District
- Garrison/HQ: Goryachiye Klyuchi, Kurilsky District, Sakhalin Oblast
- Nickname: Dukhovshchinskaya (Духовщинская)
- Engagements: World War II; Eastern Front; Battle of Kursk; Battle of Stalingrad, Battle of Smolensk, Third Battle of Kharkov, Dukhovshchina–Demidov Offensive; Invasion of Manchuria; Russo-Ukrainian War; Invasion of Ukraine; Eastern Ukraine offensive; Battle of Siversk

The 18th Machine Gun Artillery Division is a division of the Russian Ground Forces stationed in Sakhalin Oblast with administration over the Kuril Islands.

In 2022 the unit participated in the Russian invasion of Ukraine.

== First formation ==
It was first formed as the 184th Red Banner Rifle Division (Russian: 184-я Краснознамëнная стрелковая дивизия, abbreviated: 184-я сд) which was a Soviet Red Army division during World War II (1920s till 1940 – 2nd Division of Lithuania). It was with 29th Rifle Corps of 11th Army on June 22, 1941, as part of the Baltic Military District. Most of the soldiers rebelled and joined the cause of the Lithuanian Activist Front. Some of its remnants went to make up the Second Formation of the 16th Rifle Division.

== Second formation ==
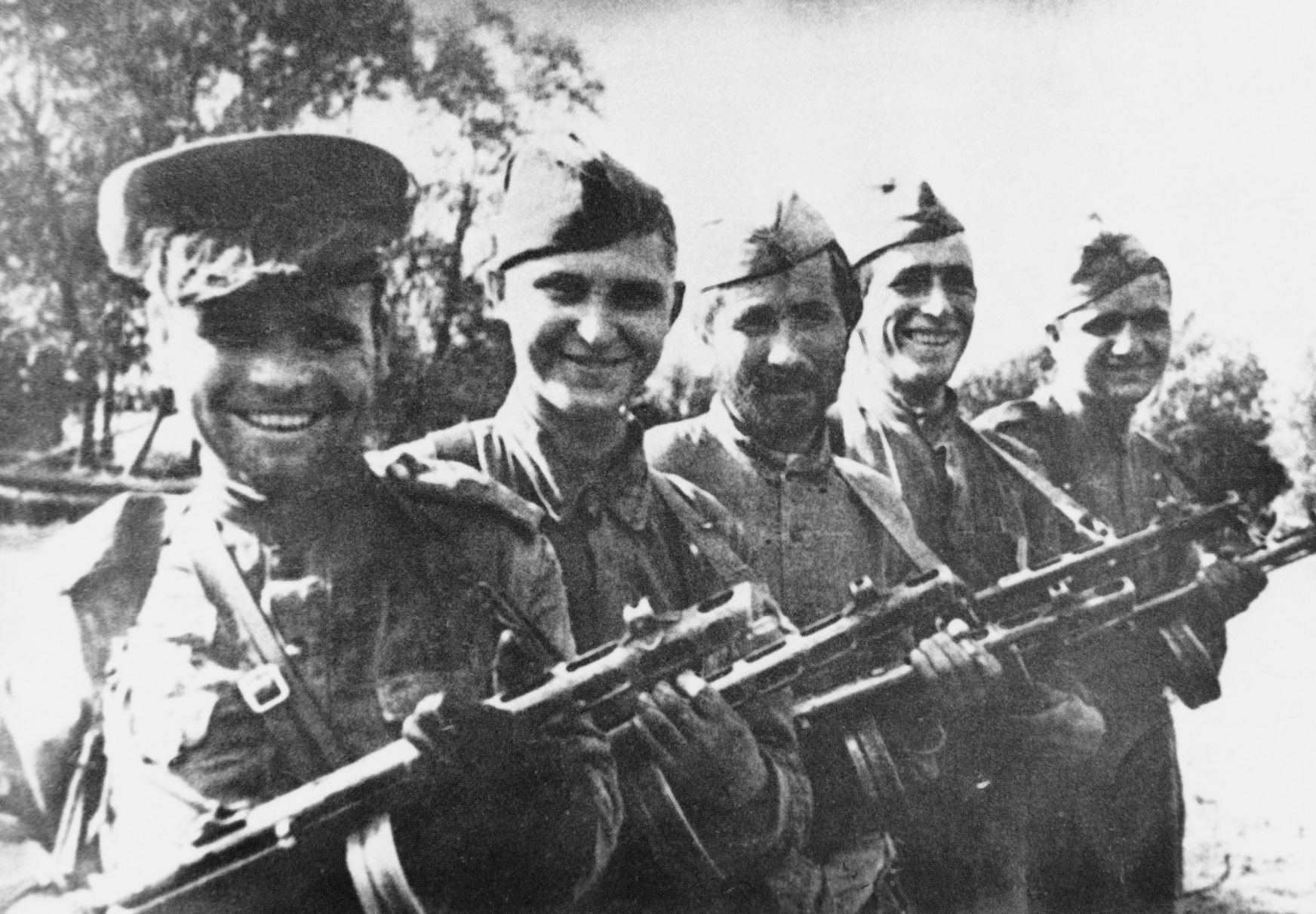
Soldiers of the 4th company of the 297th Rifle Regiment's 2nd Battalion, first to reach the East Prussian border on 17 August 1944. Company commander Senior Lieutenant Vasily Petrovich Zaytsev (first from left), killed in action 22 October, was posthumously made a Hero of the Soviet Union.

Its Second Formation was activated in October 1941, a redesignation of the 4th NKVD Rifle Division, which had been active in the Crimea since September 1941. The division fought as part of the 62nd Army during the Battle of Stalingrad under Colonel Koida from July 17 to September 15, 1942.

Among the most notable division members was Roza Shanina. On July 12, 1944, the division occupied Trakai jointly with the 45th Rifle Corps. During the East Prussian Offensive, the division hoisted the flag of the Soviet Union on the Soviet state border. It was then transferred to the Far East and fought as part of 45th Rifle Corps, 5th Army, during the invasion of Manchuria.

During the war, the division was part of the 2nd Guards Rifle Corps (39th Army), 3rd Tank Army, 5th Army, 62nd Army. It disbanded in 1945-46.

Some 12 men of the 184th Division were awarded the title Hero of the Soviet Union, among them Vasily Zaytsev.

The 109th Fortified Region had been serving in the Far East. Circa 1946 it became the 18th Machine Gun Artillery Brigade.

On June 8, 1946, on the basis of the 184th Rifle Division and the 18th Machine Gun Artillery Brigade, the 18th Machine-Gun Artillery Division was created in Primorski Krai, comprising the:

- 38th,
- 40th,
- and 49th Machine-Gun Artillery Regiments.

It was disbanded in 1949.

== Third formation ==
The division was reformed in mid-May 1978 in Knyaze-Volkonskoye, Khabarovsk Krai, without inheriting the lineage of the previous formation. It was transferred to the Kuril Islands during the summer of 1978.

=== Defense of the Kuril Islands ===
The main responsibility for the defense of the Kuril Islands falls to the 18th Machine Gun Artillery Division of the Eastern Military District. The headquarters of the division are located in Goryachiye Klyuchi on the Iturup Island. It also has garrisons on Kunashir Island and Shikotan Island. The division was previously the only division-strength military formation remaining in the Armed Forces of Russia, along with the 201st Military Base in Tajikistan. The division's aging infrastructure is in need of overhaul. There are also Border Guard Service troops stationed on the islands.

In case of attack by Japan, the Russian forces on the Kuril Islands are expected to hold out for only one to four days unless they receive support.

In 2011, it was reported that the K-300P Bastion-P system was being deployed in the islands. The division became part of the 68th Army Corps in 2014. In 2022 it was reported that the division had started to receive upgraded T-80BVM main battle tanks as part of its equipment. The division is estimated to have about 3,500 troops under its command and is currently made up of two machine-gun artillery battalions, a motor-rifle battalion, an artillery battalion, a tank company or battalion, one rocket artillery battery, a short-range air defense company, an air defense battalion, and a support company.

=== Russo-Ukrainian War ===
In May 2022 it was reported that the 18th Machine Gun Artillery Division was participating in the Russo-Ukrainian War near Izium. By July 2022, they were reported to be participating in combat near Sloviansk against the defending 81st Airmobile Brigade and a special forces unit from the National Guard of Ukraine.

== Commanders ==
Commanders
Name	Date
Kombrig (later Major General) Vladas Karvelis	August 30, 1940 – May 1941
Colonel Vasily Abramov	August–December 1941
Major-General Stanislav Poplavsky	January–March 1942
Colonel Samuil Koyda	March 15, 1942 – January 18, 1943; February 11 – March 1, 1943
Major Pavel Galuza	January 23 – February 10, 1943
Colonel Stepan Khoteyev	March 18 – May 23, 1943
Colonel Samuil Tsukaryov	May 24 – December 12, 1943
Colonel Aleksandr Belov	December 13, 1943 – June 1, 1944
Major-General Basan Gorodovikov	June 10 – December 11, 1944; February 19 – September 3, 1945
Colonel Ivan Mayskiy	December 12, 1944 – January 15, 1945
Major-General Rakhim Maksutov	January 17 – February 18, 1945
