= Antsiferov Island =

Uninhabited island in the Kuril Island chain

Antsiferov
Native name: Остров Анциферова (Russian); 志林規島 (Japanese)
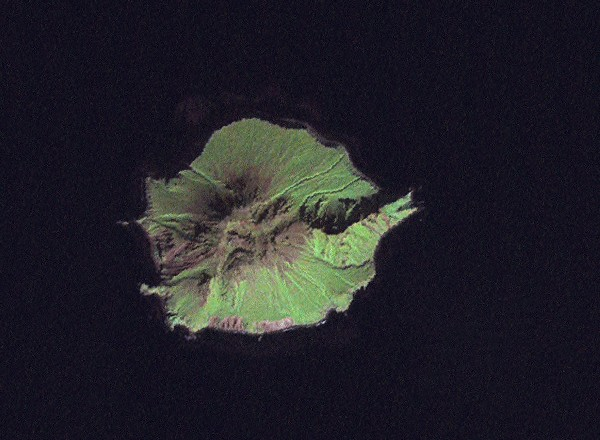
- NASA picture of Antsiferov from space

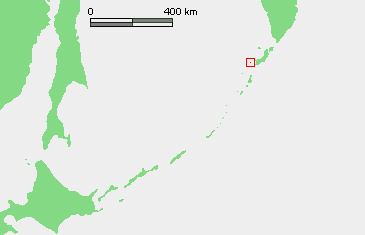

- Location within Sakhalin Oblast
- Interactive map of Antsiferov
- Other name: Shirinki

Geography
- Location: Sea of Okhotsk
- Coordinates: 50.20°N 154.98°E
- Archipelago: Kuril Islands
- Area: 7 km^{2} (2.7 sq mi)
- Highest elevation: 761 m (2497 ft)

Administration
- Russia

Demographics
- Population: 0
- Ethnic groups: Ainu (formerly)

Antsiferov Island (Russian: Остров Анциферова), also known as Shirinki Island (Japanese: 志林規島, Hepburn: Shirinki-tō; Russian: Остров Ширинки), is an uninhabited volcanic island located in the northern Kuril Islands chain in the Sea of Okhotsk in the northwest Pacific Ocean. Its Japanese name derives from the Ainu language for "place of tall waves". Its nearest neighbor is Paramushir, located 15 km away across the Luzhin Strait. It is currently named for the cossack explorer Danila Antsiferov, who first described it along with other northern Kuril islands in the early eighteenth century.

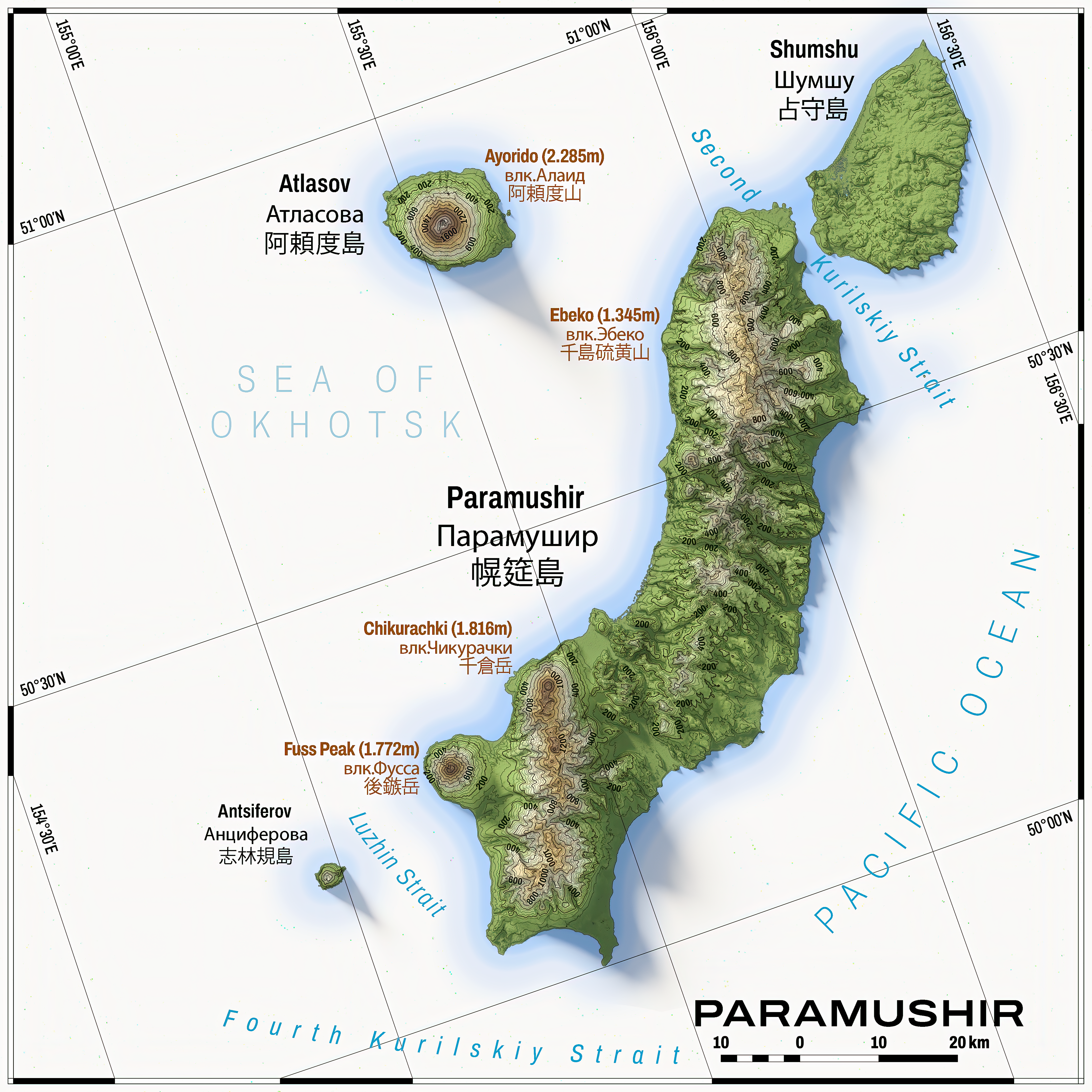
Topographic map showing Antsiferov to the west of Paramushir

== Geology ==
Antsiferov is a roughly circular island with an area of 6 km^{2} and is part of a spur range extending to the west of the main Kuril islands arc. The island is a stratovolcano with a diameter of 4.25 km and with a central peak (Japanese 蓮華岳; Renge-dake) with a height of 761 metres which is marked by a caldera which is 0.75 kilometre in diameter, which is breached to the south. Two lava domes are located near the walls of the breach, which appear to be of relatively recent origin, although no volcanic eruptions have been observed on Antsiferov in modern times. Much of the island is covered by pumice from pyroclastic-fall deposits.

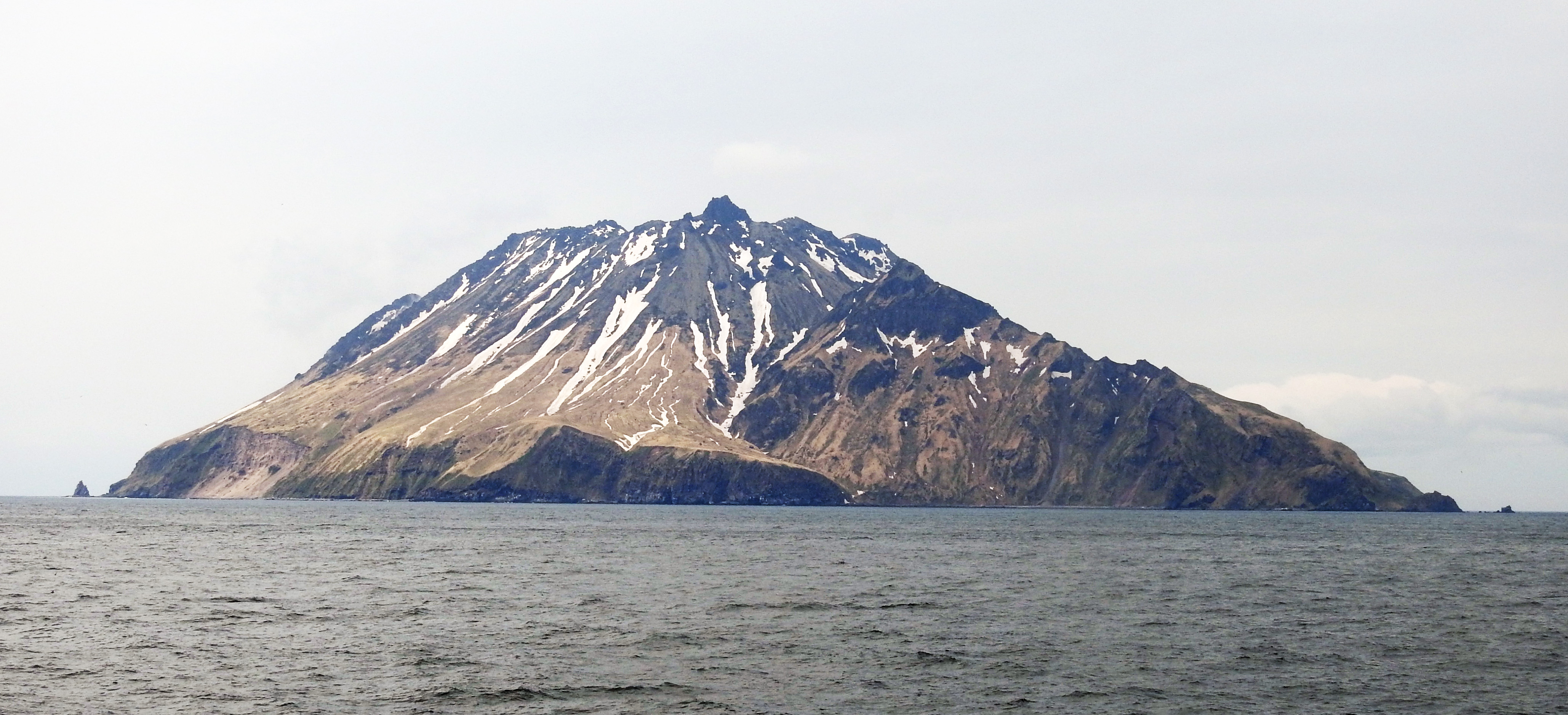
View of Antsiferov Island from the Sea of Okhotsk

== Fauna ==
The southern end of Antsiferov is the site of one of five major Steller sea lion breeding rookeries (about 600 animals) on the Kuril Islands. Because of the absence of terrestrial predators, it is also the home of very dense colonies of northern fulmars and tufted puffins which nest in the hummocks along its slopes. Cliff-dwelling birds, such as kittiwakes and thick-billed murres are also abundant.

== History ==
Antsiferov had no permanent habitation prior to European contact, but was visited in summer by the Ainu tribes for hunting. Claimed by the Empire of Russia, sovereignty was passed to the Empire of Japan per the Treaty of Saint Petersburg along with the rest of the Kuril islands. The island was formerly administered as part of Shimushu District of Nemuro Subprefecture of Hokkaidō. After World War II, the island came under the control of the Soviet Union, and is now administered as part of the Sakhalin Oblast of the Russian Federation. The island is now part of a wildlife refuge, and approach within 20 km by fishing vessels is prohibited.

== See also ==
- List of volcanoes in Russia
