= Otrada =

Otrada Отрада
- Selo
- Location within Bashkortostan Location within Russia
- Coordinates: 53°58′N 55°07′E
- Country: Russia
- Region: Bashkortostan
- District: Alsheyevsky District

Population (2010)
  - Total: 208
- Time zone: UTC+5:00

Otrada (Russian: Отрада) is a rural locality (a selo) in Kipchak-Askarovsky Selsoviet, Alsheyevsky District, Bashkortostan, Russia. The population was 208 as of 2010. There are 3 streets.

== Geography ==
Otrada is located 30 km southeast of Rayevsky (the district's administrative centre) by road. Balandino is the nearest rural locality.
