= Luzhin Strait =

Stretch of sea which separates Antsiferov from the Paramushir coast

Coordinates: 50.6933°N 156.16°E

Luzhin Strait (or Third Kuril Strait) is a stretch of sea which separates Antsiferov from the Paramushir coast. It is named after Russian cartographer Fyodor Luzhin.

Gymnelus soldatovi (Eelpout) have been found at a depth of 100 m. in the strait.
