= Operation Wedlock =

British counterespionage investigation

Operation Wedlock was a 20-year investigation by MI5 looking for a suspected Russian double-agent within MI6. Operation Wedlock ended in 2015 as "inconclusive". According to Gordon Corera in his book The Spy in the Archive: How One Man Tried to Kill the KGB, the basis for the investigation was that the CIA alleged that an unknown MI6 officer was "turned by Moscow" and supported Russia's interests by sending to Russia secrets from MI6.
