= Krabozavodskoye =

Krabozavodskoye Крабозаводское
- Selo
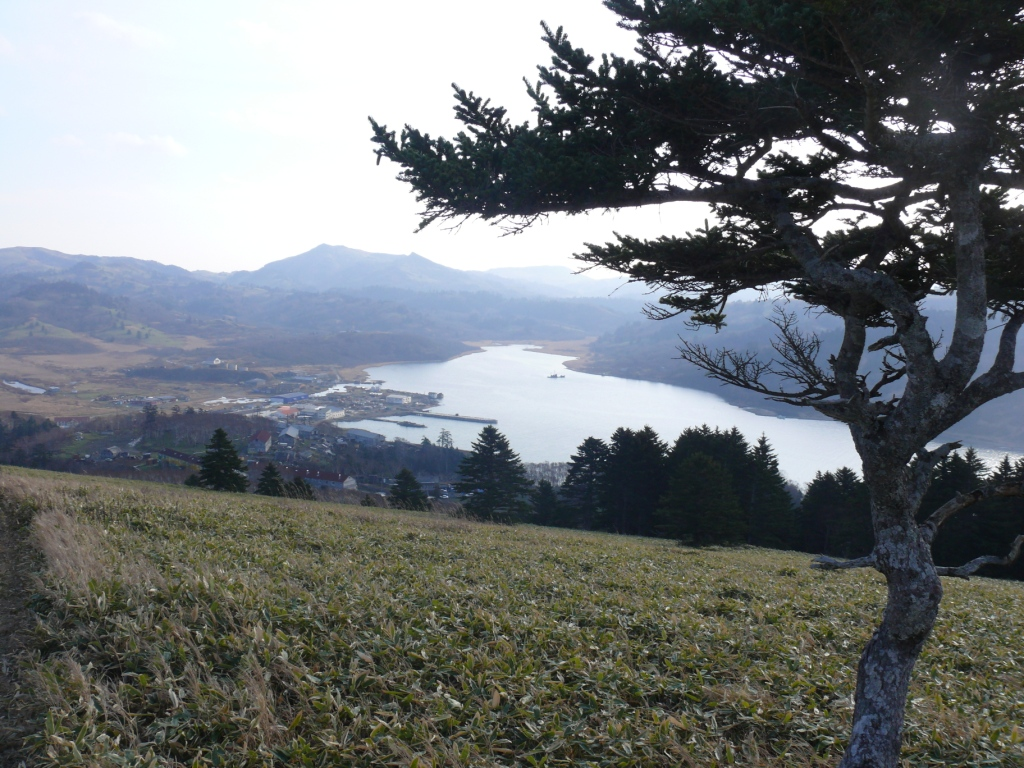
- View of Krabozavodskoye and Crab Bay from the north
- Interactive map of Krabozavodskoye
- Location of Krabozavodskoye Krabozavodskoye (Sakhalin Oblast)
- Coordinates: 43°49′49″N 146°45′06″E
- Country: Russia
- Federal subject: Sakhalin Oblast
- Administrative district: Yuzhno-Kurilsky District

Population (2010 Census)
  - Total: 947
  - Estimate (2021): 1,515 (+60%)
- Time zone: UTC+11 (MSK+8)
- Postal code: 694521
- OKTMO ID: 64756000141

Krabozavodskoye (Russian: Крабозаводское), also known as Anama (Japanese: 穴澗), is a village (selo) on Shikotan island in Yuzhno-Kurilsky District, Sakhalin Oblast, Russia.
