= Goryachiye Klyuchi, Kurilsky District, Sakhalin Oblast =

Village in Russia

Coordinates: 45°04′58″N 147°45′38″E

Goryachiye Klyuchi (Russian: Горя́чие Ключи́) is a rural locality (a selo) in Kurilsky District of Sakhalin Oblast, Russia, located on the Iturup Island.

The main responsibility for the defence of the Kuril Islands falls to the 18th Machine Gun Artillery Division of the Eastern Military District. The headquarters of the Division are located in Goryachiye Klyuchi.

Postal code: 694534.
