= Sakhalin constituency =

Russian legislative constituency

Sakhalin single-member constituency
- Constituency of the Russian State Duma

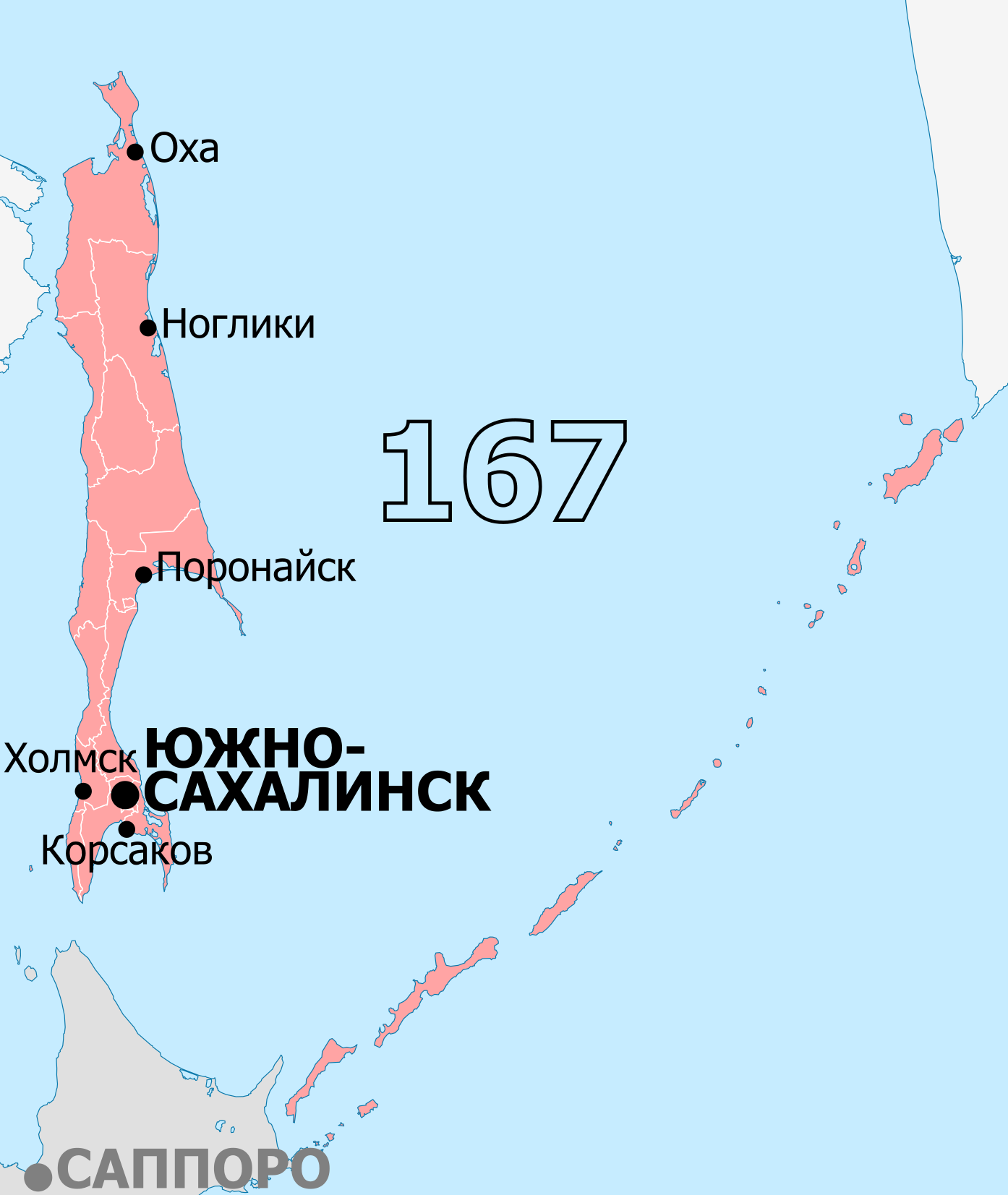
- Deputy: Georgy Karlov; United Russia
- Federal subject: Sakhalin Oblast
- Districts: Alexandrovsk-Sakhalinsky, Anivsky, Dolinsky, Kholmsky District, Korsakovsky, Kurilsky, Makarovsky, Nevelsky, Nogliksky, Okhinsky, Poronaysky, Severo-Kurilsky, Smirnykhovsky, Tomarinsky, Tymovsky, Uglegorsky, Yuzhno-Kurilsky, Yuzhno-Sakhalinsk
- Voters: 373,514 (2026)

The Sakhalin constituency (No.168 (Note: No.159 in 1993-1995, No.160 in 1995-2007, No.167 in 2016–2026)) is a Russian legislative constituency in Sakhalin Oblast. The constituency encompasses the entire territory of Sakhalin Oblast. It is also the only Russian constituency situated exclusively on islands.

The constituency has been represented since 2016 by United Russia deputy Georgy Karlov, four-term State Duma member and businessman.

== Boundaries ==
1993–2007, 2016–present: Alexandrovsk-Sakhalinsky District, Anivsky District, Dolinsky District, Kholmsky District, Korsakovsky District, Kurilsky District, Makarovsky District, Nevelsky District, Nogliksky District, Okhinsky District, Poronaysky District, Severo-Kurilsky District, Smirnykhovsky District, Tomarinsky District, Tymovsky District, Uglegorsky District, Yuzhno-Kurilsky District, Yuzhno-Sakhalinsk
The constituency has been covering the entirety of Sakhalin Oblast since its initial creation in 1993.

== Members elected ==
Election	Member	Party
1993	Boris Tretyak	Independent
1995	Ivan Zhdakayev (Note: died in December 2005)	Communist Party
1999	Ivan Zhdakayev	Communist Party
2003	Ivan Zhdakayev	Communist Party
2006	Svetlana Ivanova	Communist Party
2007	Proportional representation - no election by constituency	
2011	Proportional representation - no election by constituency	
2016	Georgy Karlov	United Russia
2021	Georgy Karlov	United Russia
2026	Georgy Karlov	United Russia

== Election results ==
=== 1993 ===
Summary of the 12 December 1993 Russian legislative election in the Sakhalin constituency
Candidate	Party	Votes	%
Boris Tretyak	Independent	55,041	23.29%
Aleksandr Grishko	Civic Union	49,385	20.90%
Valentin Fyodorov	Independent	43,264	18.31%
Viktor Sirenko	Party of Russian Unity and Accord	34,299	14.52%
against all		38,955	16.49%
Total		236,294	100%

=== 1995 ===
Summary of the 17 December 1995 Russian legislative election in the Sakhalin constituency
Candidate	Party	Votes	%
Ivan Zhdakayev	Communist Party	61,582	23.42%
Boris Tretyak (incumbent)	Independent	55,031	20.93%
Lyubov Shubina	Women of Russia	27,653	10.52%
Mikhail Romanovsky	Political Movement of Transport Workers	23,269	8.85%
Nikolay Dolgikh	Independent	17,489	6.65%
Mikhail Glazov	Liberal Democratic Party	17,229	6.55%
Sergey Ponomarev	Congress of Russian Communities	11,431	4.35%
Yury Stiplin	Kedr	8,337	3.17%
Anatoly Zhilin	Independent	5,573	2.12%
Valentin Chumakov	Independent	4,108	1.56%
Tatyana Yatsmirskaya	Federal Democratic Movement	3,658	1.39%
against all		23,584	8.97%
Total		262,943	100%

=== 1999 ===
Summary of the 19 December 1999 Russian legislative election in the Sakhalin constituency
Candidate	Party	Votes	%
Ivan Zhdakayev (incumbent)	Independent	55,267	24.43%
Boris Tretyak	Independent	46,475	20.55%
Sergey Ponomarev	Independent	22,859	10.11%
Viktor Dolgikh	Independent	13,224	5.85%
Pavel Alborov	Independent	9,864	4.36%
Valery Kulbakov	Independent	7,962	3.52%
Valery Kukushkin	Independent	7,104	3.14%
Sergey Sedov	Party of Pensioners	6,769	2.99%
Vladislav Rukavets	Our Home – Russia	6,112	2.70%
Nina Moskvina	Independent	5,780	2.56%
Nina Gultyayeva	Independent	4,815	2.13%
Larisa Moskvina-Yevgrashina	Independent	2,523	1.12%
against all		33,518	14.82%
Total		226,197	100%

=== 2003 ===
Summary of the 7 December 2003 Russian legislative election in the Sakhalin constituency
Candidate	Party	Votes	%
Ivan Zhdakayev (incumbent)	Communist Party	61,888	28.12%
Vladimir Yefremov	United Russia	46,262	21.02%
Sergey Podolyan	Independent	44,209	20.09%
Viktor Yefremov	Union of Right Forces	12,314	5.60%
Olga Blinova	Independent	6,062	2.75%
Andrey Polukhanov	Liberal Democratic Party	5,480	2.49%
Nadezhda Veter	United Russian Party Rus'	3,903	1.77%
Irina Yanko	Independent	3,313	1.51%
Oleg Lopatka	Independent	1,553	0.71%
Valery Voytenkov	Great Russia – Eurasian Union	1,072	0.49%
against all		29,289	13.31%
Total		220,053	100%

=== 2006 ===
Summary of the 29 June 2006 Russian by-election in the Sakhalin single-member constituency
Candidate	Party	Votes	%
Svetlana Ivanova	Communist Party	42,049	41.31%
Aleksandr Gusto	United Russia	31,512	30.96%
Andrey Nagibin	The Greens	7,933	7.79%
Andrey Polukhanov	Liberal Democratic Party	2,686	2.63%
Vitaly Guliy	Independent	2,664	2.61%
Aleksandr Kolodkin	Independent	1,396	1.37%
against all		11,378	11.17%
Total		101,780	100%

=== 2016 ===
Summary of the 18 September 2016 Russian legislative election in the Sakhalin constituency
Candidate	Party	Votes	%
Georgy Karlov	United Russia	60,280	42.88%
Svetlana Ivanova	Communist Party	35,148	25.00%
Dmitry Fleyer	Liberal Democratic Party	15,458	11.00%
Aleksandr Zenkin	Communists of Russia	5,616	3.99%
Eduard Taran	A Just Russia	5,550	3.95%
Veniamin Park	Yabloko	4,801	3.41%
Aleksey Grigorenko	Rodina	4,722	3.36%
Irina Repina	Patriots of Russia	2,838	2.02%
Total		140,586	100%

=== 2021 ===
Summary of the 17-19 September 2021 Russian legislative election in the Sakhalin constituency
Candidate	Party	Votes	%
Georgy Karlov (incumbent)	United Russia	56,558	38.65%
Aleksey Korniyenko	Communist Party	35,820	24.48%
Roman Vedeneyev	New People	14,488	9.90%
Dmitry Fleyer	Liberal Democratic Party	9,792	6.69%
Aleksandr Anistratov	A Just Russia — For Truth	9,176	6.27%
Oleg Koretsky	Communists of Russia	6,914	4.72%
Aleksandr Konkov	Rodina	3,624	2.48%
Anton Gurkin	Yabloko	3,130	2.14%
Total		146,345	100%

=== 2026 ===
Summary of the 18-20 September 2026 Russian legislative election in the Sakhalin constituency
Candidate	Party	Votes	%
Georgy Karlov (incumbent)	United Russia	95,228	54.48%
Pavel Ashikhmin	Communist Party	23,036	13.18%
Ivan Rybakov	New People	14,122	8.08%
Yevgeny Lyuby	Liberal Democratic Party	10,807	6.18%
Irina Repina	Yabloko	6,966	3.99%
Olga Rashitova	Communists of Russia	6,008	3.44%
Vadim Politsinsky	A Just Russia	5,371	3.07%
Yevgeny Zamotayev	The Greens	4,274	2.45%
Aleksandr Zorin	Party of Direct Democracy	2,560	1.46%
Total		174,784	100%
