= Oroks =

People in the Sakhalin Oblast

Oroks Alternative names: Orok, Ul'ta, Ulcha, Uil'ta, Nani
Ульта, Ульча, Уильта, Нани
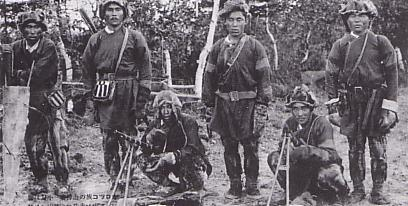
- Ulta people, before 1945

Total population
- c. 360 (est.)

Regions with significant populations
- Russia: Sakhalin: 295
- Japan: 20 (1989)

Languages
- Orok, Russian, Japanese

Religion
- Shamanism, Russian Orthodox Christianity

Related ethnic groups
- Evens, Evenks, Ulchs, Nanai, Oroch, Udege

Settlement of the Uilta (Oroks) in the Far Eastern Federal District by urban and rural settlements in %, 2010 census

Oroks (Ороки in Russian; self-designation: Ulta, Ulcha), sometimes called Uilta, are a people in the Sakhalin Oblast (mainly the eastern part of the island) in Russia. The Orok language belongs to the Southern group of the Tungusic language family. In the 2002 Russian census, there were 346 Oroks living in Northern Sakhalin by the Okhotsk Sea and Southern Sakhalin in the district by the city of Poronaysk. In the 2010 census there were 295 Oroks in Russia.

== Etymology ==
The name Orok is believed to derive from the exonym Oro given by a Tungusic group meaning "a domestic reindeer". The Orok self-designation endonym is Ul'ta, probably from the root Ula (meaning "domestic reindeer" in Orok). Another self-designation is Nani. Occasionally, the Oroks, as well as the Orochs and Udege, are erroneously called Orochons. The Uilta Association in Japan claims that the term Orok has a derogatory connotation.

== Population and settlement ==
The total number of Oroks in Russia, in the 2002 Russian Census, was 346 people. They live mostly in Sakhalin Oblast. Most of the Oroks are concentrated in three settlements – Poronaysk, Nogliki and the village of Val, Nogliksky District. 144 Oroks live in Val. Other places in which the Orok people live include: the villages of Gastello and Vakhrushev in Poronaysky District; the village of Viakhtu in Alexandrovsk-Sakhalinsky District; the village of Smirnykh, Smirnykhovsky District; Okhinsky District; and Yuzhno-Sakhalinsk, the administrative center of Sakhalin Oblast.

Orok people live on the island of Hokkaido, Japan – in 1989, there was a community of about 20 people near the city of Abashiri. Their number is currently unknown.

== History ==
Orok oral tradition indicates that the Oroks share history with the Ulch people, and that they migrated to Sakhalin from the area of the Amgun River in mainland Russia. Research indicates that this migration probably took place in the 17th century at the latest.

The Russian Empire gained complete control over Orok lands after the 1858 Treaty of Aigun and 1860 Convention of Peking. A penal colony was established on Sakhalin between 1857 and 1906, bringing large numbers of Russian criminals and political exiles, including Lev Sternberg, an important early ethnographer on Oroks and the island's other indigenous people, the Nivkhs and Ainu. Before Soviet collectivization in the 1920s, the Orok were divided into five groups, each with their own migratory zone.

Following the Bolshevik Revolution in 1922, the new government of the Soviet Union altered prior imperial policies towards the Oroks to bring them into line with communist ideology. In 1932, the northern Oroks joined the collective farm of Val, which was specialised in reindeer breeding, together with smaller numbers of Nivkhs, Evenks and Russians.

Southern Sakhalin came under the control of the Empire of Japan after the Russo-Japanese War, administering it as Karafuto Prefecture. The Uilta, or Oroks, were classified as "Karafuto natives" (樺太土人), and were not entered into Japanese-style family registers, in contrast to the Ainu, who had "mainland Japan" family registers. By 1930, 304 Oroks would be registered in the indigenous settlement of Otasu. Like the Karafuto Koreans and the Nivkh, but unlike the Ainu, the Uilta were thus not included in the evacuation of Japanese nationals after the Soviet invasion in 1945.

Some Nivkhs and Uilta who served in the Imperial Japanese Army were held in Soviet work camps. After court cases in the late 1950s and 1960s, they were recognised as Japanese nationals and permitted to migrate to Japan. Most settled around Abashiri, Hokkaidō. The Uilta Association of Japan was founded to fight for Uilta rights and the preservation of Uilta traditions in 1975 by Dahinien Gendanu.

== Language and culture ==
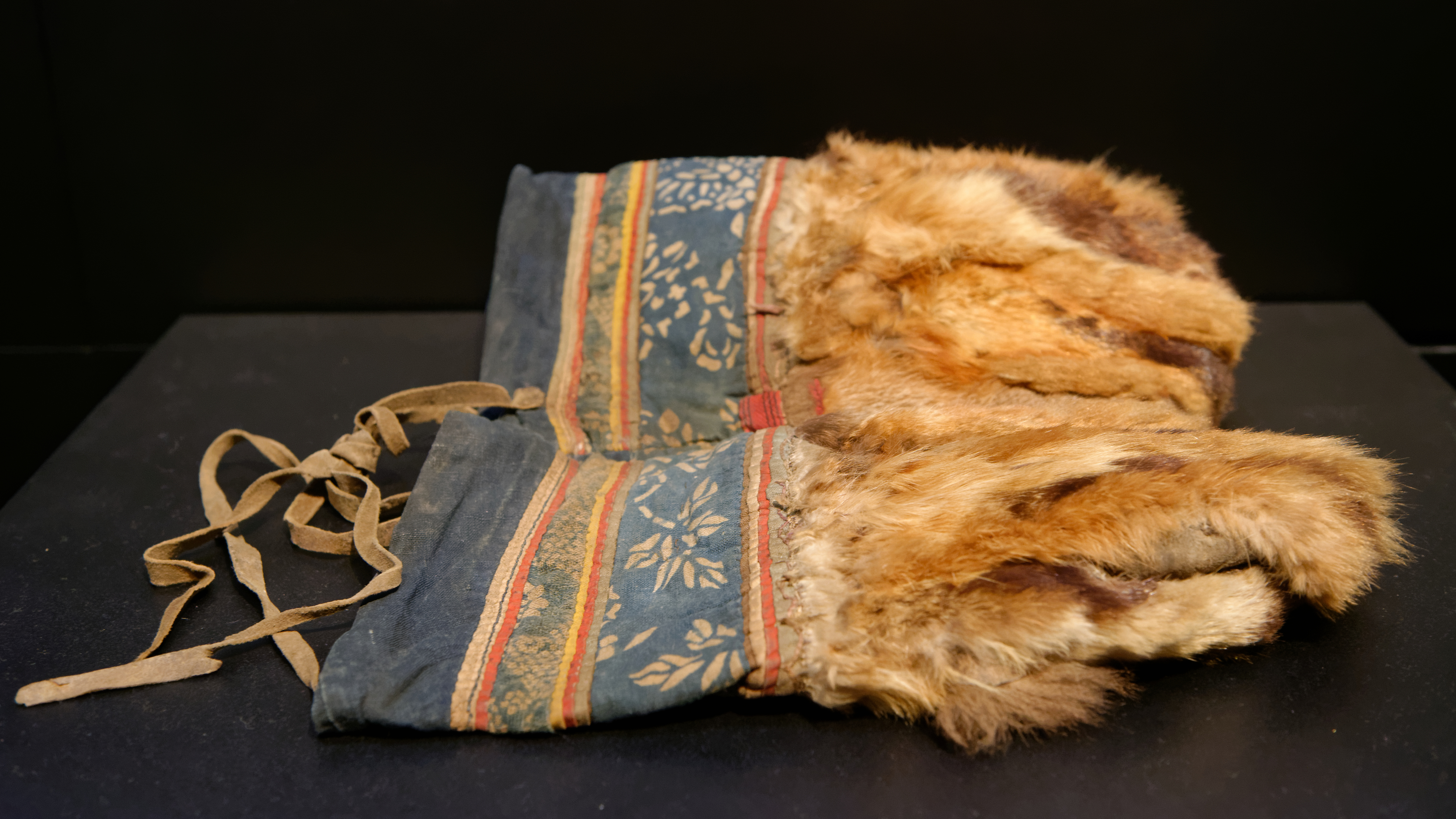
Red fox fur mittens of the Orok people, 19th century.

The Orok language belongs to the Southern group of the Tungusic language family. At present, 64 people of the Sakhalin Oroks speak the Orok language, and all Oroks speak Russian. An alphabetic script, based on Cyrillic, was introduced in 2007. A primer has been published, and the language is taught in one school on Sakhalin.

The Oroks share cultural and linguistic links with other Tungusic peoples, but before the arrival of Russians, they differed economically from similar peoples due to their herding of reindeer. Reindeer provided the Oroks, particularly in northern Sakhalin, with food, clothing, and transportation. The Oroks also practiced fishing and hunting. The arrival of Russians has had a major effect on Orok culture, and most Oroks today live sedentary lifestyles. Some northern Oroks still practice semi-nomadic herding alongside vegetable farming and cattle ranching. In the south, the leading occupations are fishing and industrial labor.

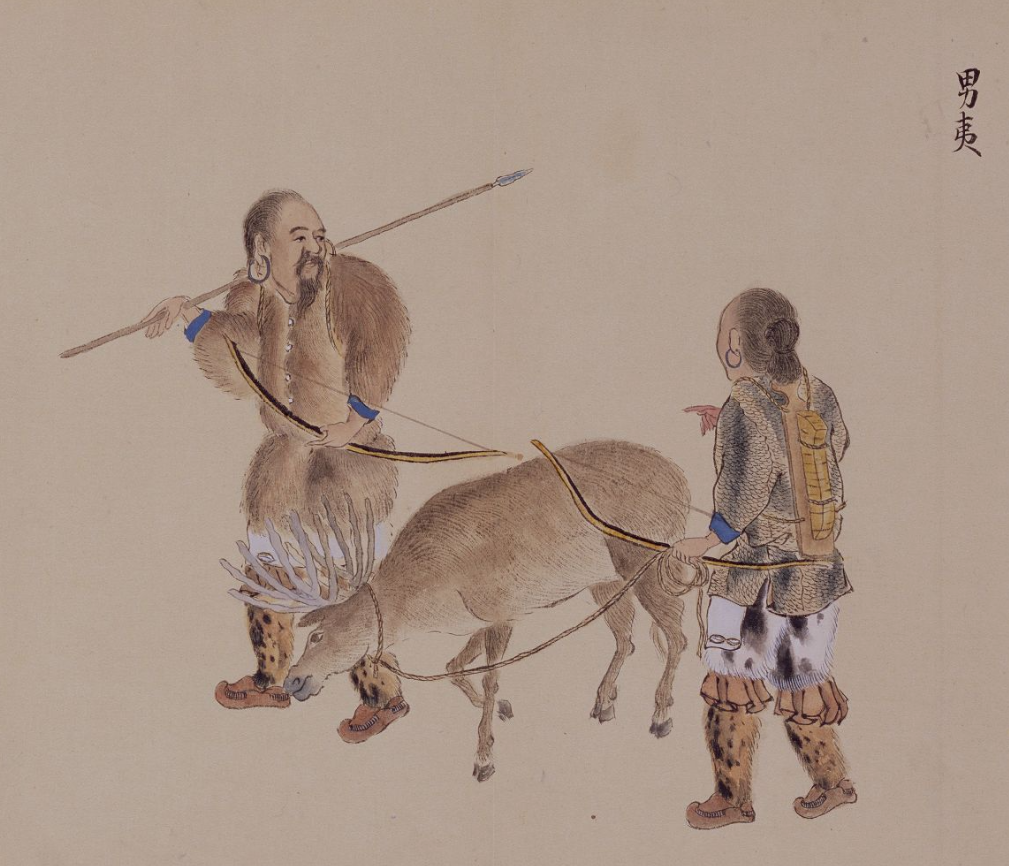
Men of Oroks
From a book written by Mamiya Rinzō & Murakami Teisuke, 1810, Japan

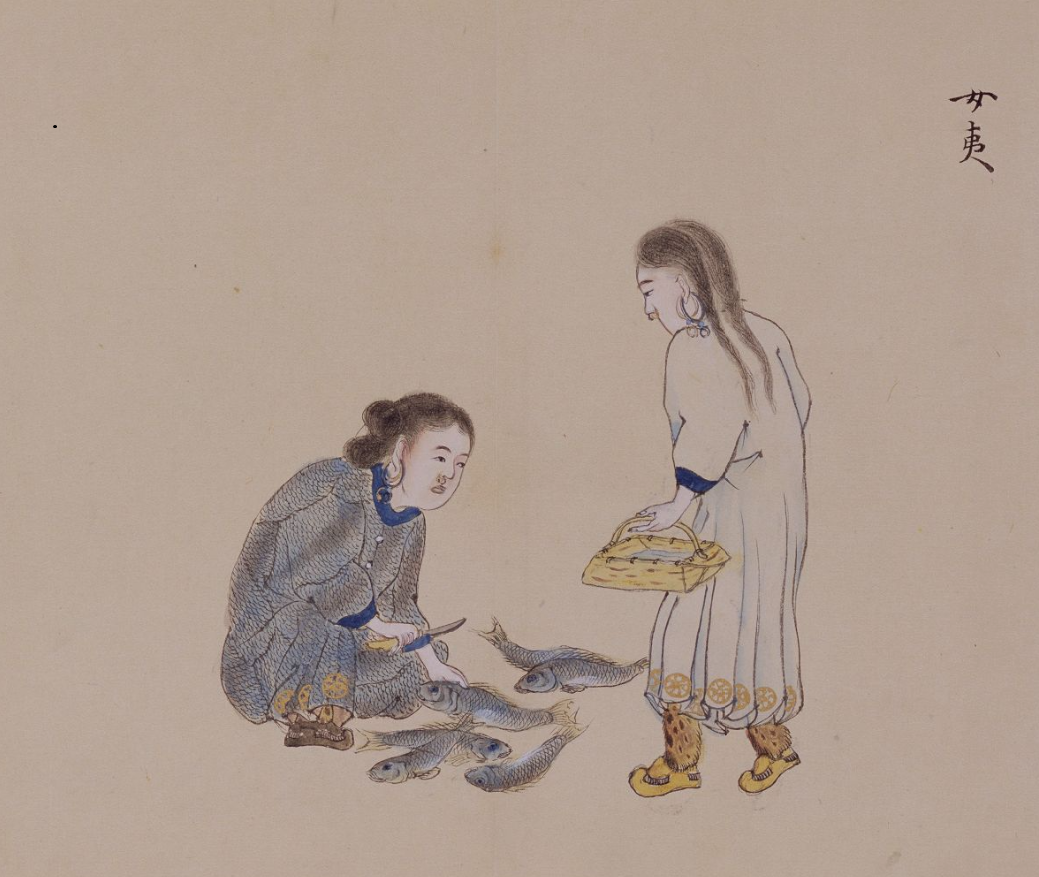
Women of Oroks
From a book written by Mamiya Rinzō & Murakami Teisuke, 1810, Japan

== Rites of passage ==
Orok boys, when it came of time, would usually participate in a sturgeon hunt, specifically hunting for the kaluga sturgeon. This involved individual hunters going out, with only a small supply of food, usually enough to last him a week, and a special type of spear. Once a kaluga was successfully killed, the hunter would extract one of the predator's teeth and carve a mark in his forehead or arm, which indicated that the hunt was successful. Due to the kaluga's size, strength and fierceness, failure to successfully kill the sturgeon usually resulted in a hunter's death. [Citation needed: sturgeon don't have teeth.]
