= Flag of Sakhalin Oblast =

Russian regional flag

Sakhalin Oblast
- Proportion: 2:3
- Adopted: 28 November 1995
- Design: White silhouette of Sakhalin Island and Kuril Islands on a faded turquoise field
- Designed by: Vitaliy Evgenievich Gomilevsky

The flag of Sakhalin Oblast features a white silhouette of Sakhalin Island and the Kuril Islands on a faded turquoise field. It was adopted on 28 November 1995.

== Ethnic flags ==
Flag	Date	Use	Description
	?–present	Flag of Ainu in Russia	
	?–present	Flag of Nivkh people	

== Other flags ==
Flag	Date	Use	Description
	2005–present	Flag of Yuzhno-Sakhalinsk	
	?–present	Flag of Alexandrovsk-Sakhalinsky District	
	?–present	Flag of Anivsky District	
	?–present	Flag of Dolinsky District	
	?–present	Flag of Kurilsky District	
	?–present	Flag of Makarovsky District	
	?–present	Flag of Nevelsky District	
	?–present	Flag of Nogliksky District	
	?–present	Flag of Okhinsky District	
	?–present	Flag of Poronaysky District	
	?–present	Flag of Severo-Kurilsky District	
	?–present	Flag of Tomarinsky District	
	?–present	Flag of Tymovsky District	
	?–present	Flag of Uglegorsky District	
	?–present	Flag of Kholmsky District	
	?–present	Flag of Yuzhno-Kurilsky District	
