= Administrative divisions of Sakhalin Oblast =

Sakhalin Oblast Russia
- Administrative center: Yuzhno-Sakhalinsk

Administrative structure (as of 2010)
- Districts: 17
- Cities/towns: 15
- Urban-type settlements: 5
- Selsovets, rural administrators, rural okrugs, and rural territorial formations: 63

Municipal structure (as of 2002)
- Rural settlements: 217 (inhabited); 30 (uninhabited)

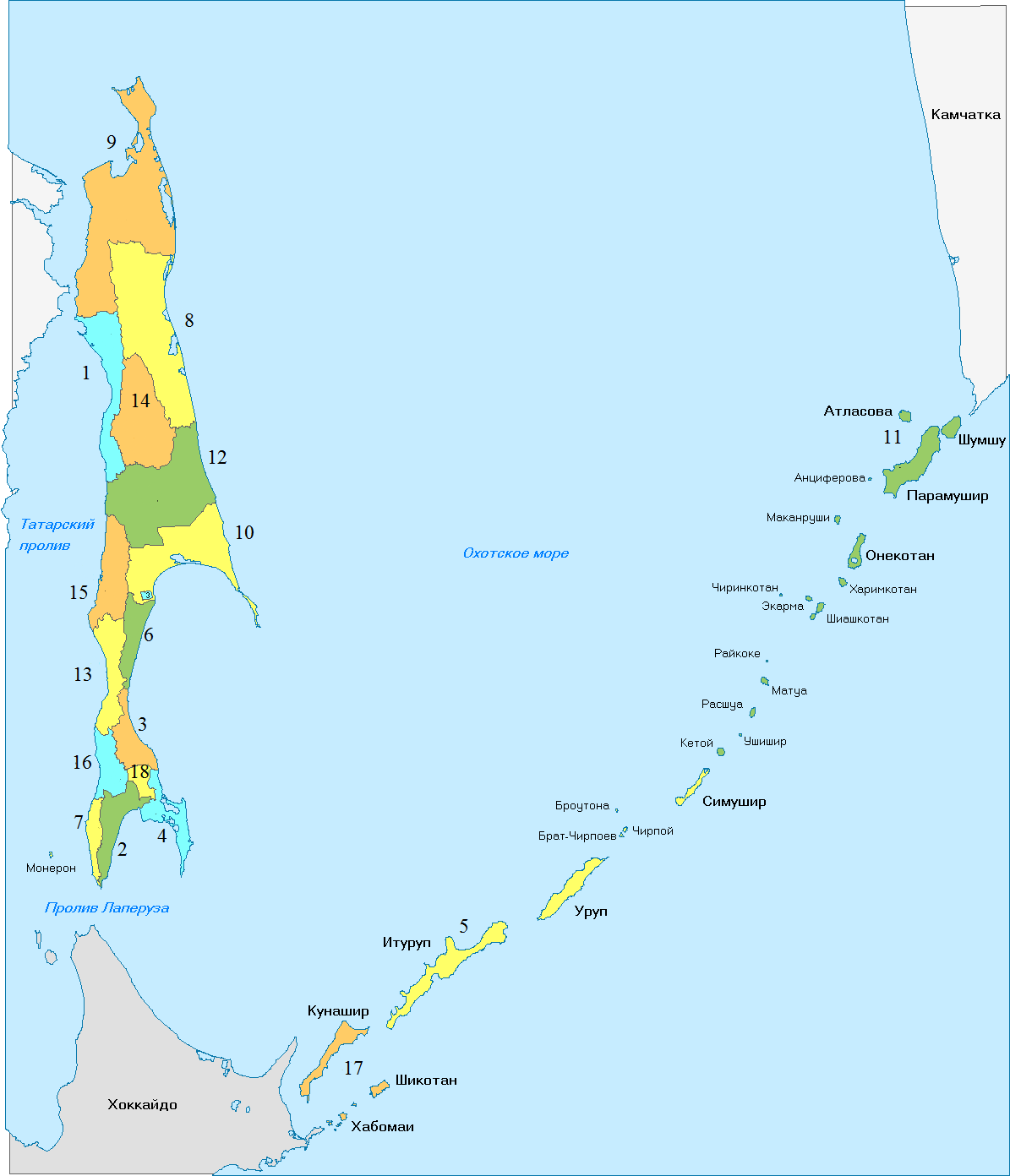

Sakhalin Oblast is a federal subject of Russia.

== Administrative and municipal divisions ==
Map

Division	Structure		OKATO	OKTMO	Urban-type settlement/ district-level town*	Rural
Division	Administrative	Municipal	OKATO	OKTMO	Urban-type settlement/ district-level town*	Rural
Yuzhno-Sakhalinsk (Южно-Сахалинск)	city	urban okrug	64 401	64 701		2 selsovets
Alexandrovsk-Sakhalinsky (Александровск-Сахалинский)	district	urban okrug	64 204	64 704	Alexandrovsk-Sakhalinsky (Александровск-Сахалинский) town*	5 rural okrugs
Anivsky (Анивский)	district	urban okrug	64 208	64 708	Aniva (Анива) town*	4 rural okrugs
Dolinsky (Долинский)	district	urban okrug	64 212	64 712	Dolinsk (Долинск) town*	7 rural okrugs
Korsakovsky (Корсаковский)	district	urban okrug	64 216	64 716	Korsakov (Корсаков) town*	5 rural okrugs
Kurilsky (Курильский)	district	urban okrug	64 220	64 720	Kurilsk (Курильск) town*	2 selsovets
Makarovsky (Макаровский)	district	urban okrug	64 224	64 724	Makarov (Макаров) town*	2 rural okrugs
Nevelsky (Невельский)	district	urban okrug	64 228	64 728	Nevelsk (Невельск) town*	4 rural territorial formations
Nogliksky (Ногликский)	district	urban okrug	64 232	64 732	Nogliki (Ноглики)	
Okhinsky (Охинский)	district	urban okrug	64 236	64 736	Okha (Оха) town*	4 selsovets
Poronaysky (Поронайский)	district	urban okrug	64 240	64 740	Poronaysk (Поронайск) town*; Vakhrushev (Вахрушев)	3 rural okrugs
Severo-Kurilsky (Северо-Курильский)	district	urban okrug	64 243	64 743	Severo-Kurilsk (Северо-Курильск)	
Smirnykhovsky (Смирныховский)	district	urban okrug	64 246	64 746	Smirnykh (Смирных)	6 rural administrations
Tomarinsky (Томаринский)	district	urban okrug	64 248	64 748	Tomari (Томари)	3 rural okrugs
Tymovsky (Тымовский)	district	urban okrug	64 250	64 750	Tymovskoye (Тымовское)	9 rural okrugs
Uglegorsky (Углегорский)	district	urban okrug	64 252	64 752	Uglegorsk (Углегорск) town*; Shakhtyorsk (Шахтёрск)	1 rural okrug
Kholmsky (Холмский)	district	urban okrug	64 254	64 754	Kholmsk (Холмск) town*	3 rural administrations
Yuzhno-Kurilsky (Южно-Курильский)	district	urban okrug	64 256	64 756	Yuzhno-Kurilsk (Южно-Курильск)	3 rural okrugs
