= Vakhrushev =

Vakhrushev (masculine) or Vakhrusheva (feminine) may refer to:

- Vasily Vakhrushev (1902–1947), Soviet statesman
- Vakhrushev (urban-type settlement), an urban-type settlement in Sakhalin Oblast, Russia
