= Georgy Karlov =

Russian politician (born 1971)

- Георгий Карлов
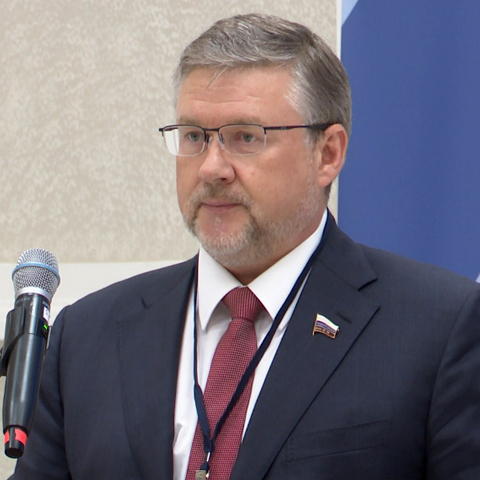

Member of the State Duma
- Incumbent
- Assumed office 21 December 2011
- Preceded by: Multi-member district
- Constituency: Sakhalin-at-large (No. 167) (2016-); Party List Seat (2011-2016)

Personal details
- Born: 4 January 1971 (age 55) Yuzhno-Sakhalinsk, Russian SFSR, Soviet Union
- Party: United Russia
- Education: Yuzhno-Sakhalinsk State Pedagogical Institute; Russian Presidential Academy of National Economy and Public Administration

Georgy Karlov (Russian: Георгий Александрович Карлов; born 4 January 1971) is a Russian politician and businessman who has served in the State Duma since 2011, as a member of United Russia.

== Early life and education ==
Georgy Alexandrovich Karlov was born in Yuzhno-Sakhalinsk, Russian Soviet Federative Socialist Republic, on 4 January 1971. He graduated with a degree in history and English from the Yuzhno-Sakhalinsk State Pedagogical Institute in 1994, and with a degree in state and municipal administration from the Russian Presidential Academy of National Economy and Public Administration in 2000.

== Career ==
Triumvirat, a production and commercial business, was formed by Karlov in 1993. He was head of the department of consumer market, trade, and services in the Sakhalin Region Administration from 1999 to 2001, chair of the committee for industry and trade from 2001 to 2003, and vice-governor from 2004 to 2005. Karlov resigned from the vice-governorship in 2005, in order to continue his business career. He was general director of Sakhalin Investment Corporation from 2005 to 2011.

In the 2008 election Karlov was elected to the Sakhalin Oblast Duma. In the 2011 election he was elected to the State Duma as a member of United Russia as a part of regional group number 66 and then from the Sakhalin constituency in the 2016 election. During his tenure in the State Duma he was a member of the natural resources, nature management and ecology committee and the deputy chair of the regional policy committee.

In 2019, Georgy Karlov became the second wealthiest deputy of the 7th State Duma with 20 million rubles. He was sanctioned by the UK government in 2022 in relation to the Russo-Ukrainian War.

== Works cited ==
=== News ===
- "Карлов, Георгий Александрович". TASS. Archived from the original on 24 June 2025.
- "Приморский девелопер из ЛДПР обошел по доходам всех депутатов Госдумы от Дальнего Востока". Prima. 15 April 2019. Archived from the original on 24 June 2025.

=== Web ===
- "Consolidated List of Financial Sanctions Targets in the UK" (PDF). Ministry of Foreign Affairs. 13 June 2024. Archived from the original (PDF) on 13 June 2024.
