= Alexandrovsk-Sakhalinsky =

Alexandrovsk-Sakhalinsky (masculine), Alexandrovsk-Sakhalinskaya (feminine), or Alexandrovsk-Sakhalinskoye (neuter) may refer to:

- Alexandrovsk-Sakhalinsky District, a district of Sakhalin Oblast, Russia
  - Alexandrovsk-Sakhalinsky Urban Okrug, a municipal formation (an urban okrug) this district is incorporated as
- Alexandrovsk-Sakhalinsky (town), a town in Alexandrovsk-Sakhalinsky District of Sakhalin Oblast, Russia
