= Kurilsk =

Town in Sakhalin Oblast, Russia

Kurilsk Курильск
- Town
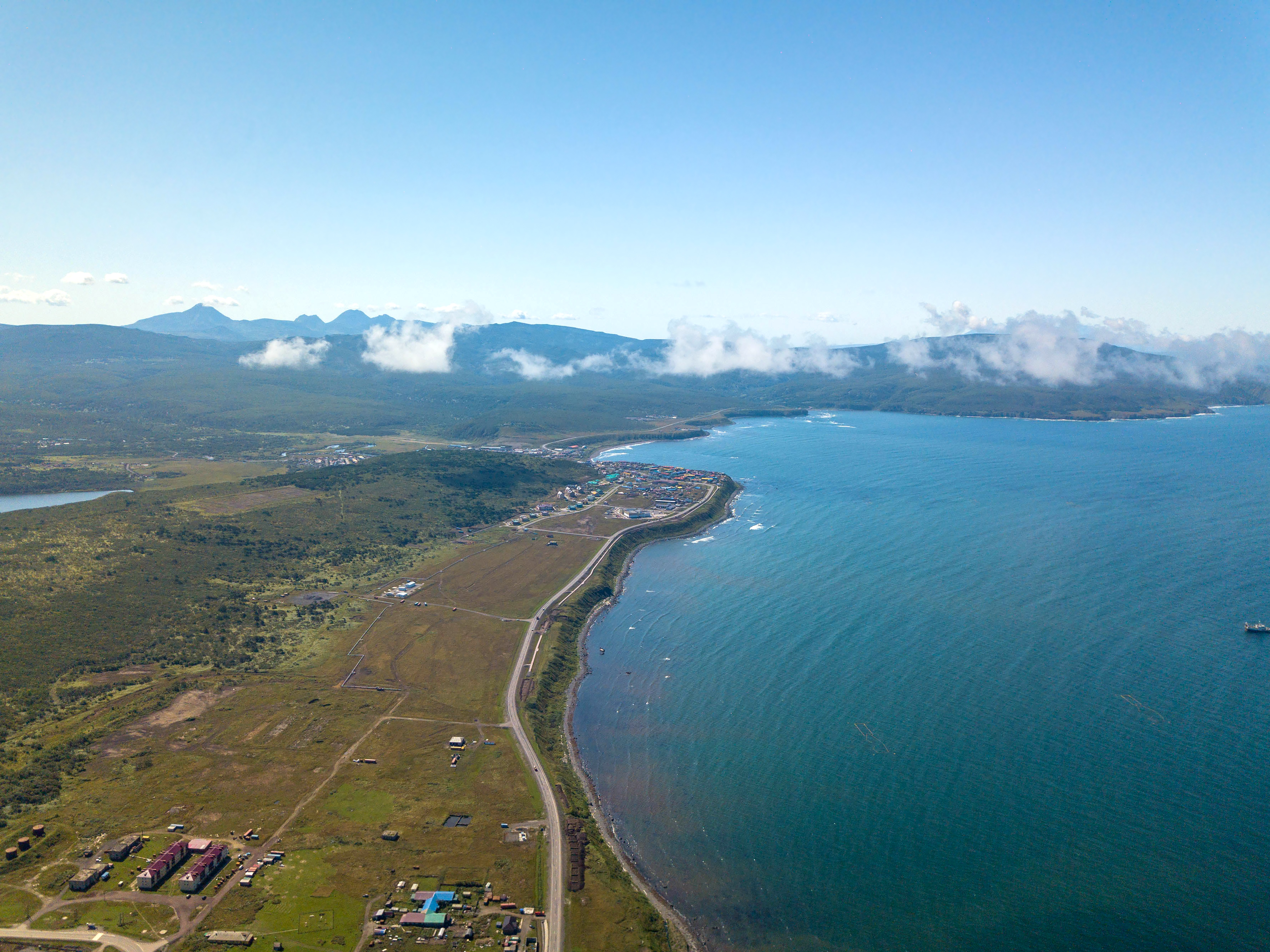

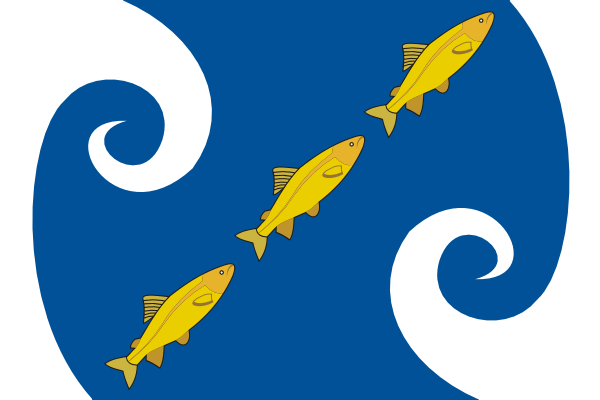
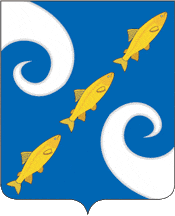
- Flag Coat of arms
- Interactive map of Kurilsk
- Location of Kurilsk Kurilsk (Sakhalin Oblast)
- Coordinates: 45°13′N 147°53′E
- Country: Russia
- Federal subject: Sakhalin Oblast
- Administrative district: Kurilsky District
- Founded: 18th century
- Elevation: 30 m (98 ft)

Population (2010 Census)
  - Total: 2,070
  - Estimate (2025): 2,537 (+22.6%)

Administrative status
  - Capital of: Kurilsky District

Municipal status
  - Urban okrug: Kurilsky Urban Okrug
  - Capital of: Kurilsky Urban Okrug
- Time zone: UTC+11 (MSK+8)
- Postal code: 694530
- Dialing code: +7 42454
- OKTMO ID: 64720000001

Kurilsk (Russian: Кури́льск) is a town and the administrative center of Kurilsky District of Sakhalin Oblast, Russia, located on the island of Iturup. Population: 2,070 (2010 census); 2,233 (2002 census); 2,699 (1989 Soviet census). It was originally a Japanese village named Shana (Japanese: 紗那村, Hepburn: Shana-mura).

== History ==
Ainu have been known to inhabit the present site of Kurilsk since the 2nd millennium BCE, with their settlement known as Shana, and under Russian rule as Syana (Сяна). The Ainu name is from San-nai (サン・ナイ), and it means "the settlement downstream of the swamp". Russian colonists first appeared on Iturup in the late 18th century, with the Japanese erecting a military post in 1800. Tensions between Russian and Japanese colonists in the area led to the Treaty of Shimoda, which saw the southern Kuril Islands officially placed under Japanese rule in 1855, remaining so until the end of World War II.

Under Japanese administration that ended in 1945, the village of Shana was the central settlement of the island. As of August 15, 1945, the population of the village was 1,001.

In 1947, the village was given its present name and granted town status by the Soviets. All Japanese villagers were exiled; however, the Japanese do not recognize it to have been legally dissolved and the city office of Nemuro in Hokkaido takes care of its family registry.

== Climate ==
Remarkably for its relatively southerly latitude, Kurilsk has a humid continental climate (Köppen Dfb) that almost qualifies as a subarctic climate owing to the powerful influence of the cold Oyashio Current which makes summers exceptionally cool. Unlike most subarctic climates, however, the winters are fairly mild and there is no permafrost. Precipitation, as with all the Kuril Islands, is very heavy owing to the influence of the Aleutian Low, though Kurilsk is a little less wet than Yuzhno-Kurilsk because of its westerly aspect which tends to shelter it from cyclonic storms originating over the Pacific. The climate actually resembles the subpolar oceanic climate of the Aleutian Islands more than the climate of interior Siberia, but the mean February temperature of −6.1 °C (21.0 °F) is well beyond the −3 °C (27 °F) threshold of oceanic climates.

Climate data for Kurilsk
Month	Jan	Feb	Mar	Apr	May	Jun	Jul	Aug	Sep	Oct	Nov	Dec	Year
Record high °C (°F)	9.9 (49.8)	9.8 (49.6)	13.0 (55.4)	21.6 (70.9)	25.7 (78.3)	25.6 (78.1)	31.9 (89.4)	30.2 (86.4)	27.7 (81.9)	24.7 (76.5)	19.5 (67.1)	13.4 (56.1)	31.9 (89.4)
Mean maximum °C (°F)	3.8 (38.8)	3.0 (37.4)	6.9 (44.4)	14.9 (58.8)	20.7 (69.3)	22.4 (72.3)	25.5 (77.9)	26.4 (79.5)	24.0 (75.2)	18.9 (66.0)	14.5 (58.1)	8.0 (46.4)	27.3 (81.1)
Mean daily maximum °C (°F)	−1.8 (28.8)	−3.0 (26.6)	−0.2 (31.6)	5.3 (41.5)	10.6 (51.1)	13.9 (57.0)	17.4 (63.3)	19.8 (67.6)	17.4 (63.3)	12.9 (55.2)	6.8 (44.2)	1.2 (34.2)	8.4 (47.0)
Daily mean °C (°F)	−4.5 (23.9)	−6.1 (21.0)	−3.4 (25.9)	2.0 (35.6)	6.6 (43.9)	10.1 (50.2)	13.8 (56.8)	16.4 (61.5)	13.9 (57.0)	9.3 (48.7)	3.7 (38.7)	−1.4 (29.5)	5.0 (41.1)
Mean daily minimum °C (°F)	−7.1 (19.2)	−9.1 (15.6)	−6.5 (20.3)	−1.3 (29.7)	2.5 (36.5)	6.2 (43.2)	10.1 (50.2)	12.9 (55.2)	10.3 (50.5)	5.7 (42.3)	0.6 (33.1)	−4.0 (24.8)	1.7 (35.1)
Mean minimum °C (°F)	−13.9 (7.0)	−17.0 (1.4)	−15.7 (3.7)	−7.7 (18.1)	−2.3 (27.9)	0.6 (33.1)	4.0 (39.2)	6.5 (43.7)	3.3 (37.9)	−0.7 (30.7)	−5.1 (22.8)	−10.1 (13.8)	−18.1 (−0.6)
Record low °C (°F)	−22.0 (−7.6)	−27.4 (−17.3)	−25.9 (−14.6)	−16.1 (3.0)	−6.5 (20.3)	−2.8 (27.0)	−0.8 (30.6)	1.4 (34.5)	0.2 (32.4)	−4.5 (23.9)	−9.4 (15.1)	−17.0 (1.4)	−27.4 (−17.3)
Average precipitation mm (inches)	101.4 (3.99)	65.1 (2.56)	84.7 (3.33)	77.9 (3.07)	71.4 (2.81)	51.7 (2.04)	85.0 (3.35)	109.7 (4.32)	122.2 (4.81)	133.5 (5.26)	132.2 (5.20)	116.0 (4.57)	1,150.8 (45.31)
Average precipitation days (≥ 1 mm)	18.7	12.7	11.8	9.3	9.1	7.5	9.8	8.3	10.3	13.8	17.0	19.6	147.9
Source 1: Météo climat stats
Source 2: Météo Climat

== Administrative and municipal status ==
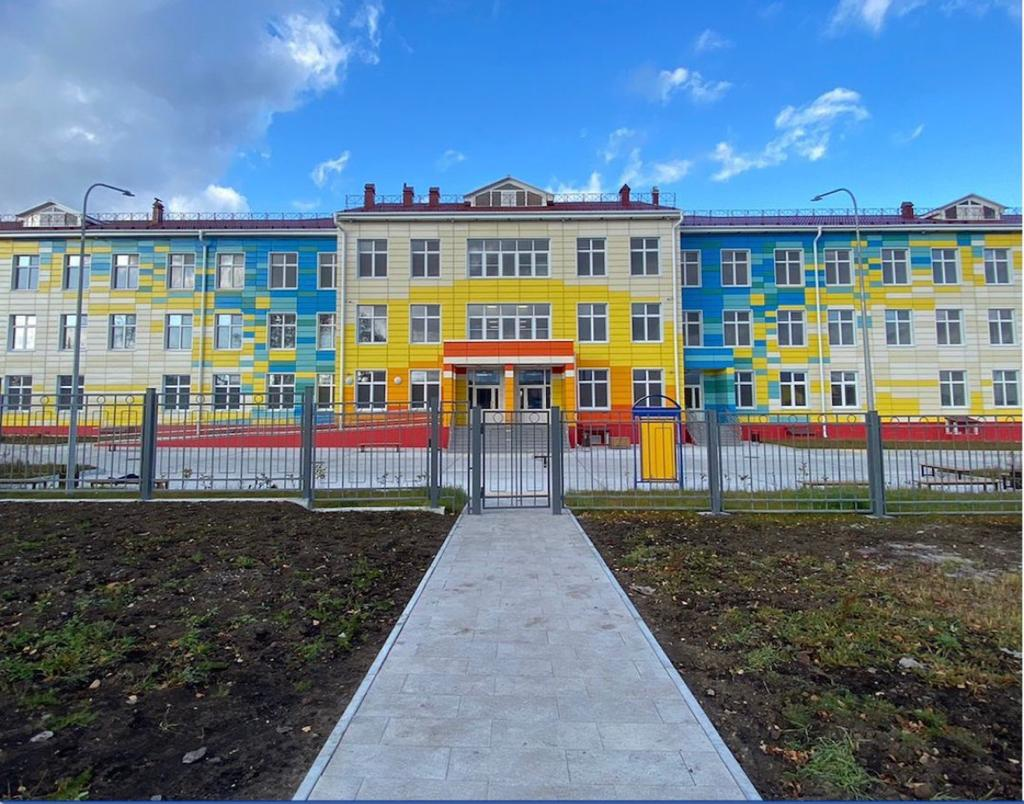
New school in the city of Kurilsk, Iturup Island

Within the framework of administrative divisions, Kurilsk serves as the administrative center of Kurilsky District and is subordinated to it. As a municipal division, the town of Kurilsk and six rural localities of Kurilsky District are incorporated as Kurilsky Urban Okrug.

== Economy ==
Kurilsk is a center for fishing and fish farming, particularly salmon. A tsunami warning station is also located in the town.
