= Kurilsky District =

Kurilsky District Курильский район (Russian)
- District
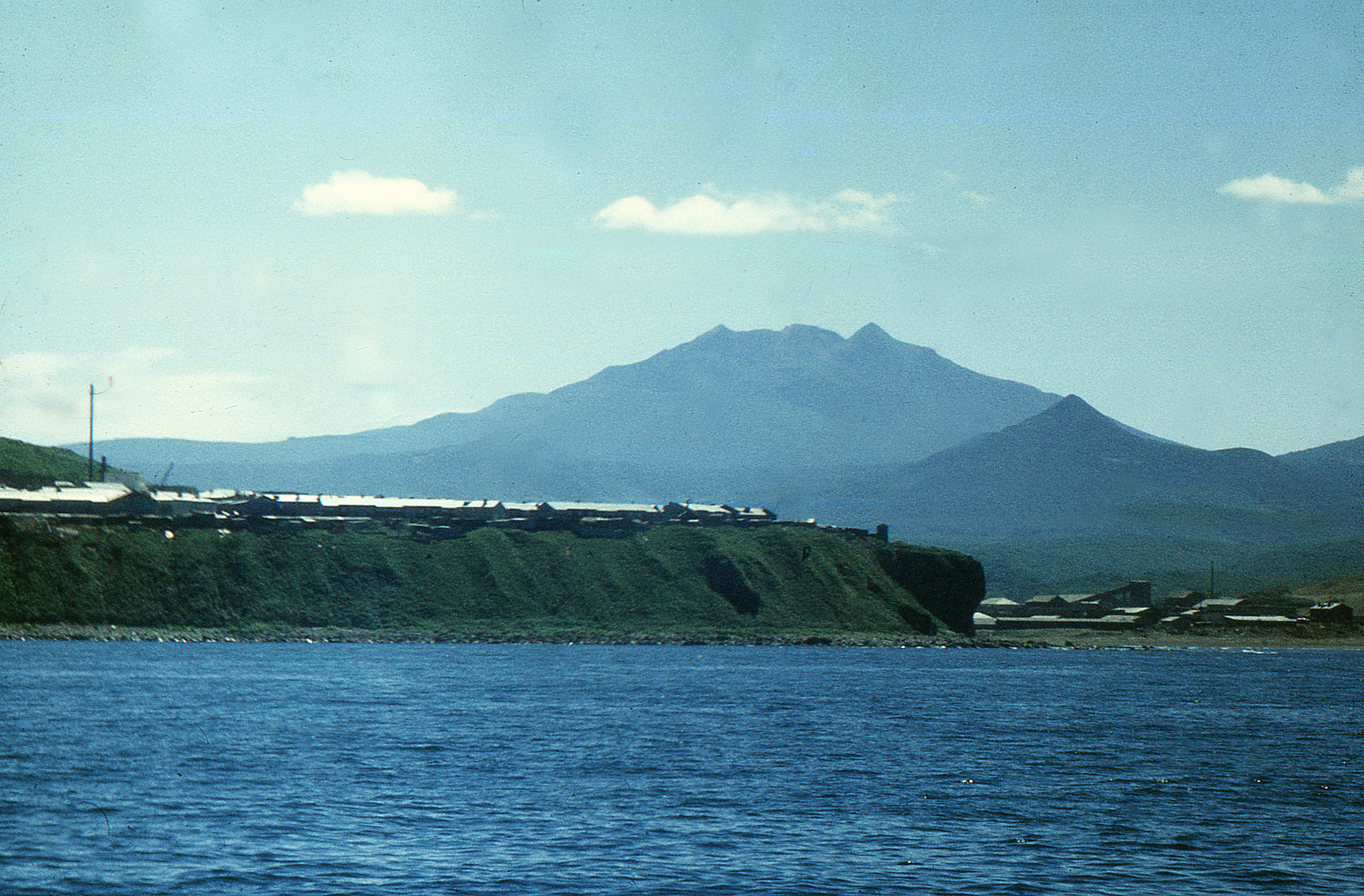
- Kurilsk and Baransky volcano on Iturup

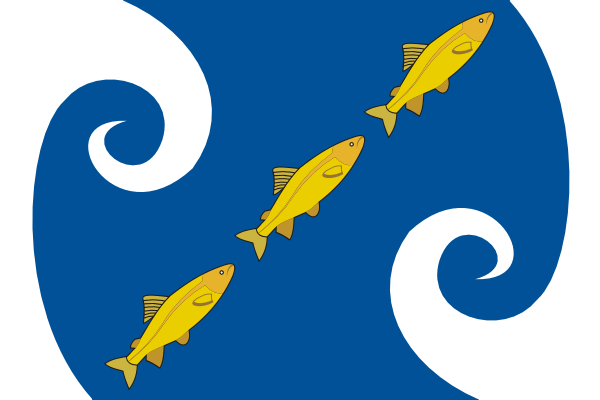
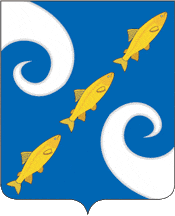
- Flag Coat of arms

- Location of Kurilsky District in Sakhalin Oblast
- Coordinates: 45°15′N 147°53′E
- Country: Russia
- Federal subject: Sakhalin Oblast
- Administrative center: Kurilsk

Area
  - Total: 5,145.9 km^{2} (1,986.8 sq mi)

Population (2010 Census)
  - Total: 7,359
  - Density: 1.430/km^{2} (3.704/sq mi)
  - Urban: 28.1%
  - Rural: 71.9%

Administrative structure
  - Inhabited localities: 1 cities/towns, 6 rural localities

Municipal structure
  - Municipally incorporated as: Kurilsky Urban Okrug
- Time zone: UTC+11 (MSK+8)
- OKTMO ID: 64720000

Kurilsky District (Russian: Кури́льский райо́н, romanized: Kuríl'skiy rayón) is a district (raion) of Sakhalin Oblast, Russia, one of the seventeen in the oblast. Municipally, it is incorporated as Kurilsky Urban Okrug. The town of Kurilsk is the administrative centre and largest settlement in the district. There are 7,359 people residing in the district as of the 2010 Russian census.

The district consists of several islands of the Kuril Island chain, the main ones being Iturup, Urup, and Simushir. Iturup is the largest and southernmost island in the district, and it is claimed by Japan as part of its "Northern Territories".

== Administration and geography ==
Kurilsky District one of the seventeen districts (raions) of Sakhalin Oblast in the Russian Far East. At the municipal level of government, the district is considered an urban okrug. The administrative centre is the town of Kurilsk.

The district covers an area of 5145.9 square kilometres and consists of the islands of Iturup, Urup, Simushir, Chirpoy and Brat Chirpoyev (the latter two collectively known as the Chyornye Bratya), all within the Kuril island chain. Iturup is the largest and southernmost island in the district, and it is also claimed by Japan as part of the "Northern Territories" in Nemuro Subprefecture, Hokkaido. Soviet troops occupied the Kuril Islands after the Allies' victory over Japan in World War II, but Japan maintains it never relinquished Iturup, nor three other islands to the south of it: Kunashir, Shikotan, and Habomai.

Russia classifies the Kuril Islands, and therefore the entire district, as part of its Far North region.

== Demographics ==
The following populations were recorded in the Russian censuses of the given years: 7,359 (2010 census); 7,108 (2002 census); 10,498 (1989 Soviet census). Kurilsk is the largest settlement and accounts for 28.1% of the district's total population.

== Coat of arms and flag ==
The coat of arms of Kurilsky District was adopted on January 11, 2002, while its corresponding flag was adopted on September 30, 2002. Both have a blue background (field) with three diagonal golden fishes representing the main islands of the district, as well as two white waves on the left and right representing the Sea of Okhotsk and the Pacific Ocean, respectively.

== See also ==
- Severo-Kurilsky District
- Yuzhno-Kurilsky District
