= Poronaysk =

Town in Sakhalin Oblast, Russia

Poronaysk Поронайск
- Town
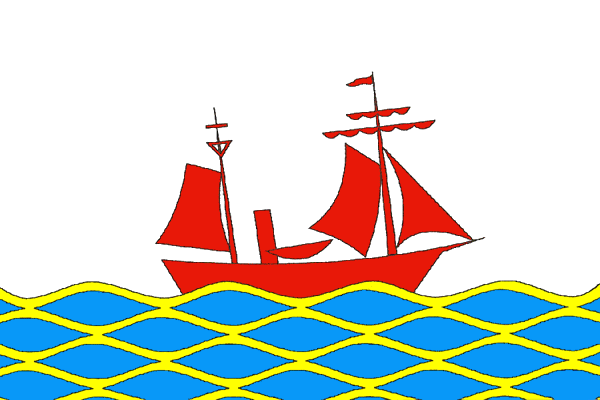
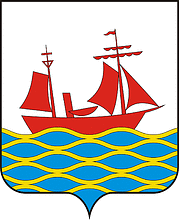
- Flag Coat of arms
- Location of Poronaysk
- Location of Poronaysk Poronaysk (Sakhalin Oblast)
- Coordinates: 49°13′N 143°07′E
- Country: Russia
- Federal subject: Sakhalin Oblast
- Administrative district: Poronaysky District
- Founded: 1869
- Elevation: 3 m (10 ft)

Population (2010 Census)
  - Total: 16,120

Administrative status
  - Capital of: Poronaysky District

Municipal status
  - Urban okrug: Poronaysky Urban Okrug
  - Capital of: Poronaysky Urban Okrug
- Time zone: UTC+11 (MSK+8)
- Postal code(s): 694240–694242
- Dialing code(s): +7 42431
- OKTMO ID: 64740000001
- Website: web.archive.org/web/20071208161219/http://www.poronajsk.ru/

Poronaysk (Russian: Поронайск; Japanese: 敷香町, romanized: Shisuka-chō; Ainu: Sistukari or Sisi Tukari) is a town and the administrative center of Poronaysky District of Sakhalin Oblast, Russia, located on the Poronay River 288 kilometers (179 mi) north of Yuzhno-Sakhalinsk. Population: 16,120 (2010 Census); 17,954 (2002 Census); 25,971 (1989 Soviet census).

== History ==
It was founded in 1869 as a Russian outpost Tikhmenevsky near the Nivkh and Ainu settlements in the area. The Treaty of Portsmouth transferred it to Japanese control along with the rest of the southern half of the island of Sakhalin. It was renamed Shisuka (敷香町, Shisuka-chō), said to mean "Sisi Tukari (in front of the mountain)" or "Siika (big river)" in the Ainu language, remaining under Japanese control until the Soviet Army retook the whole of the island in 1945.

After the town had been granted to the Soviet Union, it was named Poronaysk in 1946, after the river on which it stands. The river's name is from Ainu poro nay, meaning "broad river," "big river," or "growing river." Various Japanese place names such as Horonai (幌内) share the same etymology with Poronaysk.

== Administrative and municipal status ==
Within the framework of administrative divisions, Poronaysk serves as the administrative center of Poronaysky District and is subordinated to it. As a municipal division, the town of Poronaysk, one urban-type settlement, and eleven rural localities of Poronaysky District are incorporated as Poronaysky Urban Okrug.

== Economy ==
Poronaysk has a paper mill, as well as timber and fishing industries. Sakhalinskaya GRES power station is supplied with coal from an open cut mine close to the town.

=== Transportation ===
The town lies on the island's railway network, as well as on the main highway connecting Yuzhno-Sakhalinsk with Alexandrovsk-Sakhalinsky.

== Climate ==
Poronaysk, owing to the cold Sea of Okhotsk surrounding the town, has a subarctic climate (Dfc) with short, mild and very foggy summers and very cold winters.

Climate data for Poronaysk (extremes 1908–present)
Month	Jan	Feb	Mar	Apr	May	Jun	Jul	Aug	Sep	Oct	Nov	Dec	Year
Record high °C (°F)	2.0 (35.6)	5.5 (41.9)	12.0 (53.6)	19.8 (67.6)	33.5 (92.3)	33.9 (93.0)	35.3 (95.5)	35.0 (95.0)	30.1 (86.2)	23.5 (74.3)	16.1 (61.0)	8.4 (47.1)	35.3 (95.5)
Mean daily maximum °C (°F)	−9.6 (14.7)	−7.7 (18.1)	−2.1 (28.2)	3.6 (38.5)	9.1 (48.4)	13.7 (56.7)	17.0 (62.6)	19.3 (66.7)	17.0 (62.6)	10.2 (50.4)	0.6 (33.1)	−7.8 (18.0)	5.3 (41.5)
Daily mean °C (°F)	−14.9 (5.2)	−13.6 (7.5)	−6.8 (19.8)	0.1 (32.2)	5.0 (41.0)	9.9 (49.8)	13.9 (57.0)	15.8 (60.4)	12.3 (54.1)	5.4 (41.7)	−4 (25)	−12.9 (8.8)	0.9 (33.5)
Mean daily minimum °C (°F)	−20.4 (−4.7)	−20.2 (−4.4)	−12.4 (9.7)	−3.3 (26.1)	1.8 (35.2)	6.9 (44.4)	11.5 (52.7)	12.7 (54.9)	7.8 (46.0)	0.7 (33.3)	−8.5 (16.7)	−18.1 (−0.6)	−3.5 (25.8)
Record low °C (°F)	−39.8 (−39.6)	−39.1 (−38.4)	−34.2 (−29.6)	−23.5 (−10.3)	−8.1 (17.4)	−2.5 (27.5)	0.3 (32.5)	1.5 (34.7)	−3.3 (26.1)	−13.2 (8.2)	−29.8 (−21.6)	−36.7 (−34.1)	−39.8 (−39.6)
Average precipitation mm (inches)	31.2 (1.23)	23.3 (0.92)	44.1 (1.74)	60.0 (2.36)	72.7 (2.86)	69.1 (2.72)	86.4 (3.40)	101.9 (4.01)	105.1 (4.14)	101.9 (4.01)	53.8 (2.12)	41.7 (1.64)	791.2 (31.15)

== Sister city ==
- Kitami, Hokkaido, Japan

== Notable people ==
- Chiyo Nakamura, an author of Nivkh origin
- Taihō Kōki, yokozuna
