= Smirnykh =

Smirnykh Смирных
- Urban-type settlement
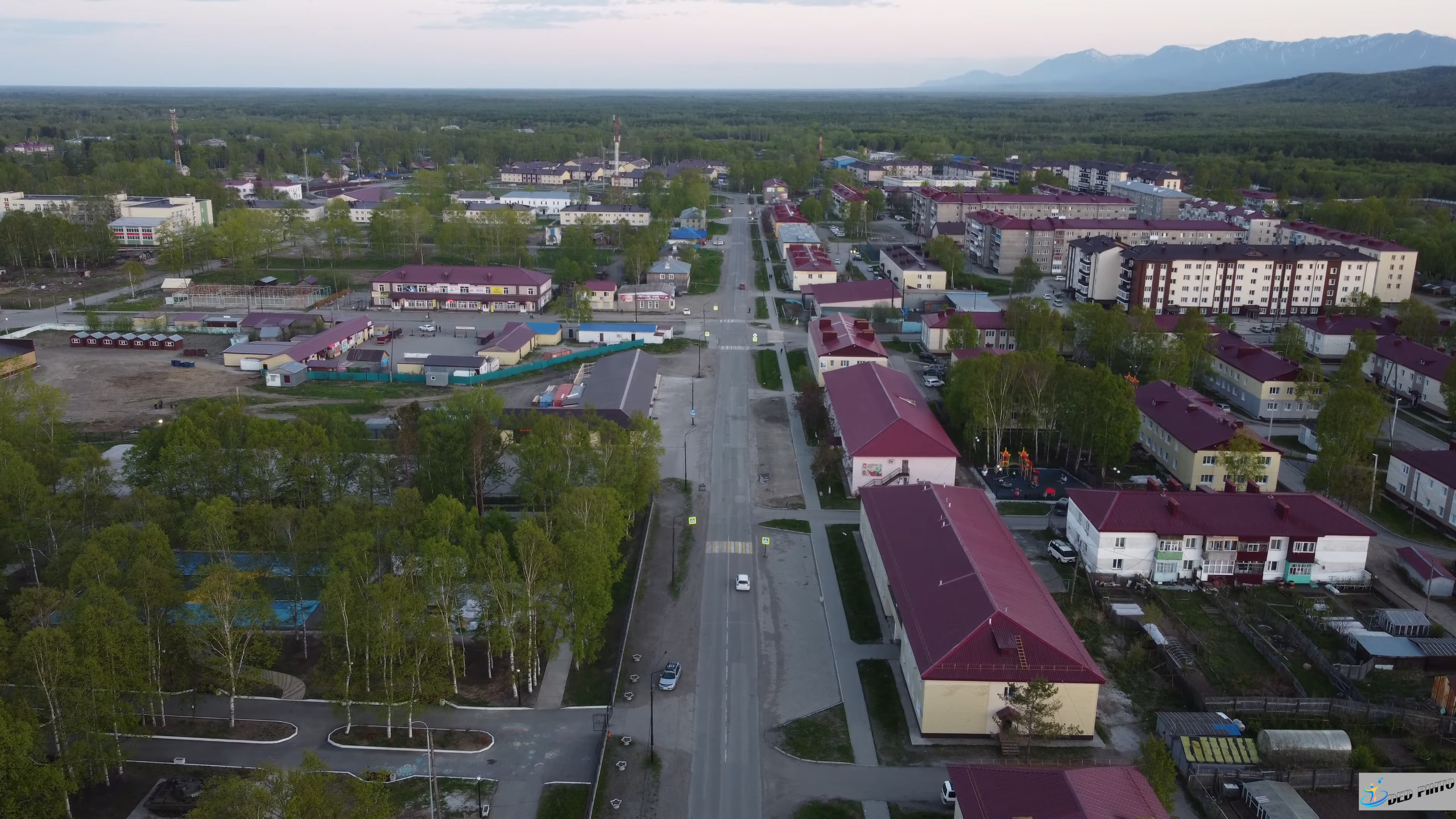
- View of Smirnykh
- Interactive map of Smirnykh
- Location of Smirnykh Smirnykh (Sakhalin Oblast)
- Coordinates: 49°45′N 142°50′E
- Country: Russia
- Federal subject: Sakhalin Oblast
- Administrative district: Smirnykhovsky District

Population (2010 Census)
  - Total: 7,399
  - Estimate (2023): 8,293 (+12.1%)

Administrative status
  - Capital of: Smirnykhovsky District

Municipal status
  - Urban okrug: Smirnykhovsky Urban Okrug
  - Capital of: Smirnykhovsky Urban Okrug
- Time zone: UTC+11 (MSK+8)
- Postal code: 694350
- Dialing code: +7 42452
- OKTMO ID: 64746000051

Smirnykh (Russian: Смирных) is an urban locality (an urban-type settlement) and the administrative center of Smirnykhovsky District of Sakhalin Oblast, Russia, located in the central part of the Sakhalin Island. Population: 7,399 (2010 census); 7,561 (2002 census); 9,693 (1989 Soviet census).

== History ==
During the period of Japanese rule over the southern half of Sakhalin from 1905-1945, its name was Keton (気屯). During fighting between Soviet and Japanese forces on the island during World War II, Battalion Commander Leonid Smirnykh and Sergeant Anton Buyukly were killed; the localities of Smyrnikh, Leonidovo, and Buyukly are named in their honor.

== Administrative and municipal status ==
Within the framework of administrative divisions, Smirnykh serves as the administrative center of Smirnykhovsky District and is subordinated to it. As a municipal division, the urban-type settlement of Smirnykh and thirteen rural localities of Smirnykhovsky District are incorporated as Smirnykhovsky Urban Okrug.

== Military ==
It was home to Smirnykh air base during the Cold War.
