= Vakhrushev (urban-type settlement) =

Urban locality in Sakhalin Oblast, Russia

Coordinates: 49°00′00″N 142°52′00″E

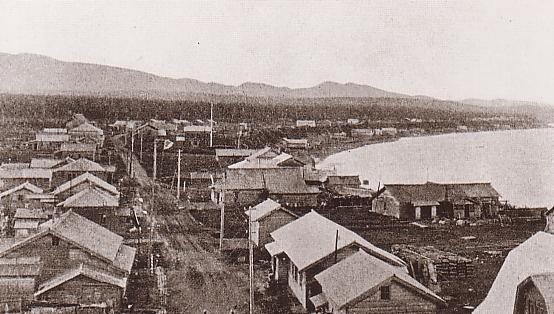
View of Tomarikeshi

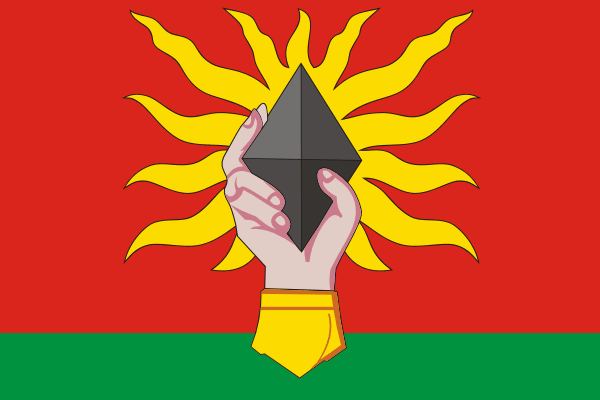
Flag of Vakhrushev

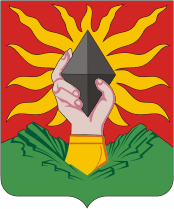
Coat of Arms of Vakhrushev

Vakhrushev (Russian: Вахрушев; Japanese: 泊岸村 Tomarikishi-mura) is an urban locality (an urban-type settlement) in the Poronaysky District in Sakhalin Oblast, Russia. Population: 2,245 (2010 census); 3,064 (2002 census); The village was named Vakhrushev, in honor of the former Minister of Coal Industry of the USSR Vasily Vakhrushev .
