= Nogliksky District =

Nogliksky District Ногликский район (Russian)
- District
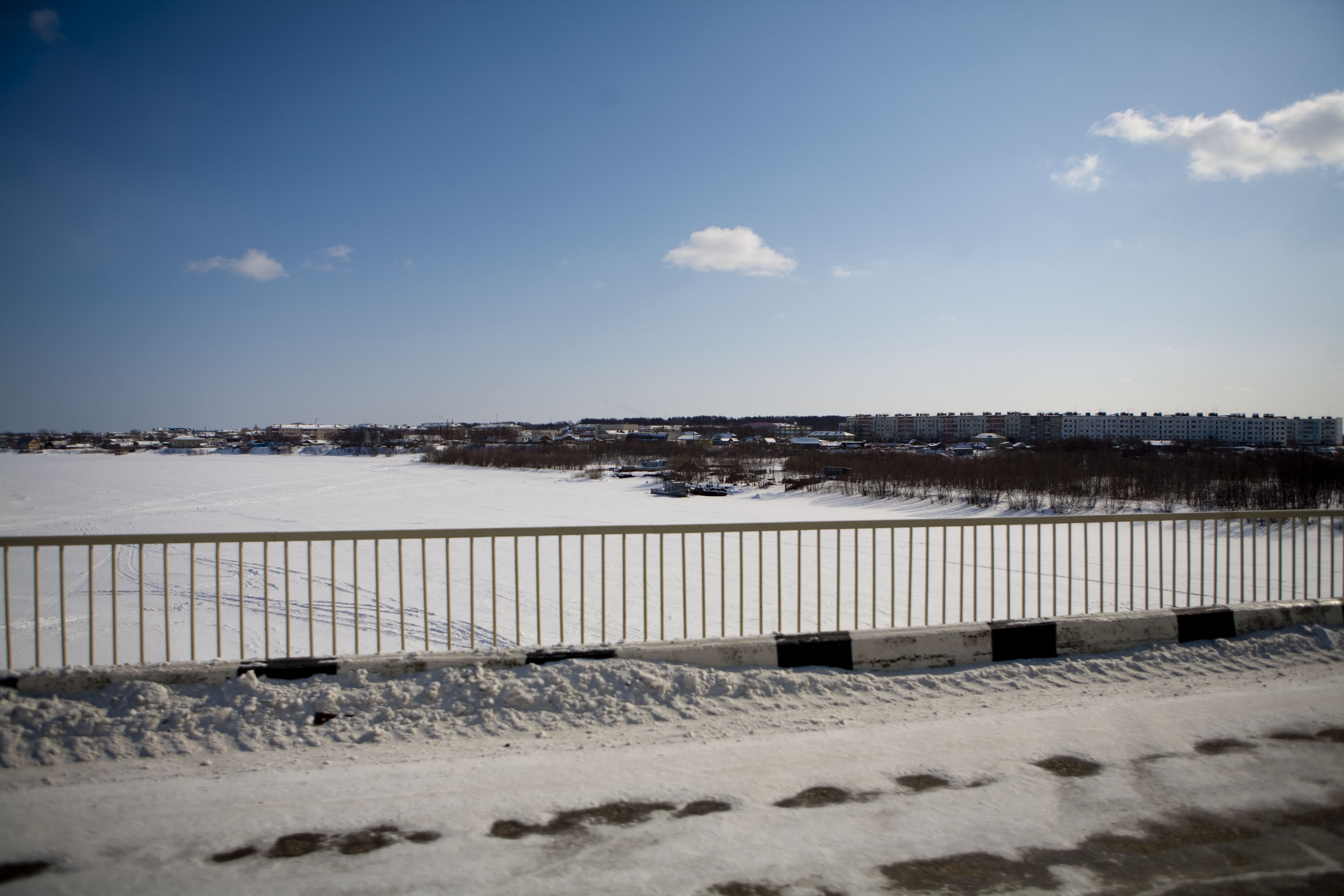
- View of Nogliki from bridge, Nogliksky District

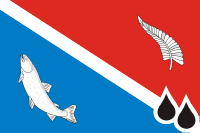
- Flag Coat of arms
- Location of Nogliksky District in Sakhalin Oblast
- Coordinates: 51°49′N 143°07′E
- Country: Russia
- Federal subject: Sakhalin Oblast
- Administrative center: Nogliki

Area
  - Total: 11,294.8 km^{2} (4,360.9 sq mi)

Population (2010 Census)
  - Total: 12,124
  - Density: 1.0734/km^{2} (2.7801/sq mi)
  - Urban: 84.4%
  - Rural: 15.6%

Administrative structure
  - Inhabited localities: 1 urban-type settlements, 11 rural localities

Municipal structure
  - Municipally incorporated as: Nogliksky Urban Okrug
- Time zone: UTC+11 (MSK+8)
- OKTMO ID: 64732000
- Website: http://www.nogliki-adm.ru/

Nogliksky District (Russian: Ногликский райо́н) is an administrative district (raion) of Sakhalin Oblast, Russia; one of the seventeen in the oblast. Municipally, it is incorporated as Nogliksky Urban Okrug. It is located in the northeast of the Island of Sakhalin. The area of the district is 11,294.8 square kilometers (4,360.9 sq mi). Its administrative center is the urban locality (an urban-type settlement) of Nogliki. Population: 12,124 (2010 census); 13,576 (2002 census); 16,786 (1989 Soviet census). The population of Nogliki accounts for 84.4% of the district's total population.

== Sources ==
- Сахалинская областная Дума. Закон №25-ЗО от 23 марта 2011 г. «Об административно-территориальном устройстве Сахалинской области», в ред. Закона №62-ЗО от 27 июня 2013 г. «О внесении изменения в статью 10 Закона Сахалинской области "Об административно-территориальном устройстве Сахалинской области"». Вступил в силу 9 апреля 2011 г.. Опубликован: "Губернские ведомости", №55(3742), 29 марта 2011 г. (Sakhalin Oblast Duma. Law #25-ZO of March 23, 2011 On the Administrative-Territorial Structure of Sakhalin Oblast, as amended by the Law #62-ZO of June 27, 2013 On Amending Article 10 of the Law of Sakhalin Oblast "On the Administrative-Territorial Structure of Sakhalin Oblast". Effective as of April 9, 2011.).
- Сахалинская областная Дума. Закон №524 от 21 июля 2004 г. «О границах и статусе муниципальных образований в Сахалинской области», в ред. Закона №45-ЗО от 27 мая 2013 г. «О внесении изменения в Закон Сахалинской области "О границах и статусе муниципальных образований в Сахалинской области"». Вступил в силу 1 января 2005 г. Опубликован: "Губернские ведомости", №175–176(2111–2112), 31 июля 2004 г. (Sakhalin Oblast Duma. Law #524 of July 21, 2004 On the Borders and Status of the Municipal Formations in Sakhalin Oblast, as amended by the Law #45-ZO of May 27, 2013 On Amending the Law of Sakhalin Oblast "On the Borders and Status of the Municipal Formations in Sakhalin Oblast". Effective as of January 1, 2005.).
