= Sakhalin Oblast =

First-level administrative division of Russia

Sakhalin Oblast Сахалинская область (Russian)
- Oblast
- Flag Coat of arms

- Coordinates: 50°33′N 142°36′E
- Country: Russia
- Federal district: Far Eastern
- Economic region: Far Eastern
- Established: October 20, 1932
- Administrative center: Yuzhno-Sakhalinsk

Government
  - Body: Oblast Duma
  - Governor: Valery Limarenko

Area
  - Total: 87,101 km^{2} (33,630 sq mi)
  - Rank: 37th

Population (2021 census)
  - Total: 466,609
  - Estimate (2018): 490,181
  - Rank: 75th
  - Density: 5.3571/km^{2} (13.875/sq mi)
  - Urban: 82.4%
  - Rural: 17.6%

GDP (nominal, 2024)
  - Total: ₽1.68 trillion (US$19.68 billion)
  - Per capita: ₽3.67 million (US$43,015.69)
- Time zone: UTC+11 (MSK+8)
- ISO 3166 code: RU-SAK
- License plates: 65
- OKTMO ID: 64000000
- Official languages: Russian
- Website: www.adm.sakhalin.ru

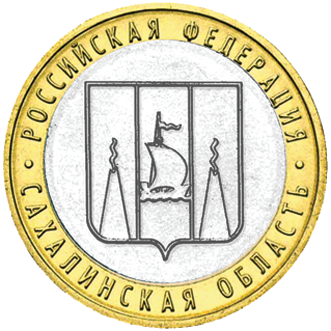
Commemorative coin of the Bank of Russia with a face value of 10 rubles (2006)

Sakhalin Oblast (Note: Russian: Сахали́нская о́бласть, romanized: Sakhalinskaya oblastʹ, IPA: [səxɐˈlʲinskəjə ˈobləsʲtʲ]) is a federal subject (oblast) of Russia comprising the island of Sakhalin and the Kuril Islands in the Russian Far East. The oblast has an area of 87,100 square kilometers (33,600 sq mi). Its administrative center and largest city is Yuzhno-Sakhalinsk. As of the 2021 Census, the oblast has a population of 466,609.

The vast majority of the oblast's residents are ethnic Russians, with a small minority of Sakhalin Koreans. Sakhalin Oblast is rich in natural gas and oil, and is Russia's second wealthiest federal subject after the Tyumen Oblast. It borders by sea Khabarovsk Krai to the west and Kamchatka Krai to the north, along with Hokkaido, Japan to the south.

== History ==
The etymology of Sakhalin can be traced back to the Manchu hydronym Sahaliyan Ula (Manchu: ᠰᠠᡥᠠᠯᡳᠶᠠᠨ
ᡠᠯᠠ) for "Black River" (i.e. the Amur River). Sakhalin shares this etymology with the Chinese province of Heilongjiang (Chinese: 黑龍江; pinyin: Hēilóngjiāng; lit. 'black dragon river').

The indigenous people of Sakhalin are the Nivkh, Orok, and Ainu minorities.

The first Europeans to explore the waters around Sakhalin Island were Ivan Moskvitin and Martin Gerritz de Vries in the mid-1600s, Jean-François de La Pérouse in 1787 and Adam Johann von Krusenstern in 1805. Early maps of Sakhalin reflect the uncertainty of the age as to whether or not the land mass was attached to the Asian continent. The fact that it is not connected was conclusively established by Mamiya Rinzō, who explored and mapped Sakhalin in 1809 and definitively recorded by Russian navigator Gennady Nevelskoy in 1849.

Japanese settlement on Sakhalin dates to at least the Edo period. Ōtomari was supposedly established in 1679, and cartographers of the Matsumae domain mapped the island, and named it "Kita-Ezo". During the Ming and Qing dynasties China considered the island part of its empire, and included the Sakhalin peoples in its "system for subjugated peoples". At no time though was any attempt ever made to establish an Imperial military presence on the island. Japan, concerned about Russian expansion in northeast Asia, unilaterally proclaimed sovereignty over the whole island in 1845. Russian settlers ignored the claim (and the similar claim of China), however, and, beginning in the 1850s, established coal mines, administration facilities, schools, prisons and churches on the island.

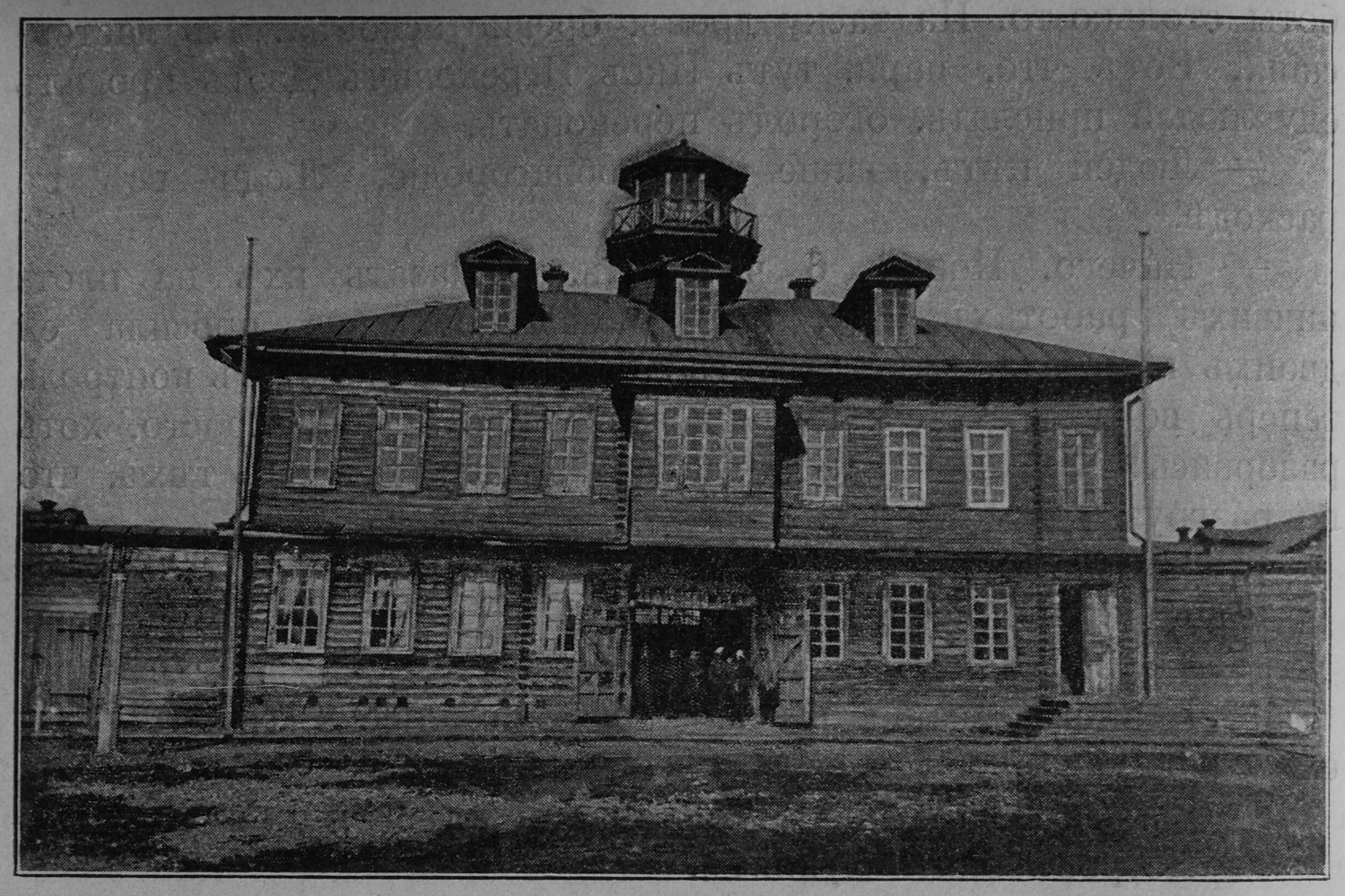
Aleksandrovskaya Prison in Alexandrovsk-Sakhalinsky in 1903

In 1855, Russia and Japan signed the Treaty of Shimoda, which declared that both nationals could inhabit the island: Russians in the north, and Japanese in the south, without a clear boundary between. Russia also agreed to dismantle its military base at Ōtomari. Following the Second Opium War, Russia forced the Qing to sign the Treaty of Aigun and Convention of Peking, under which China lost all territories north of Heilongjiang (Amur) and east of Ussuri, including Sakhalin, to Russia. A Czarist penal colony was established in 1857, but the southern part of the island was held by the Japanese until the 1875 Treaty of Saint Petersburg, when they ceded it to Russia in exchange for the Kuril islands. After the Russo-Japanese War, Russia and Japan signed the Treaty of Portsmouth of 1905, which resulted in the southern part of the island below 50° N passing to Japan; the Russians retained the other three-fifths of the area. South Sakhalin was administered by Japan as Karafuto-chō (樺太庁), with the capital Toyohara, now known as Yuzhno-Sakhalinsk.

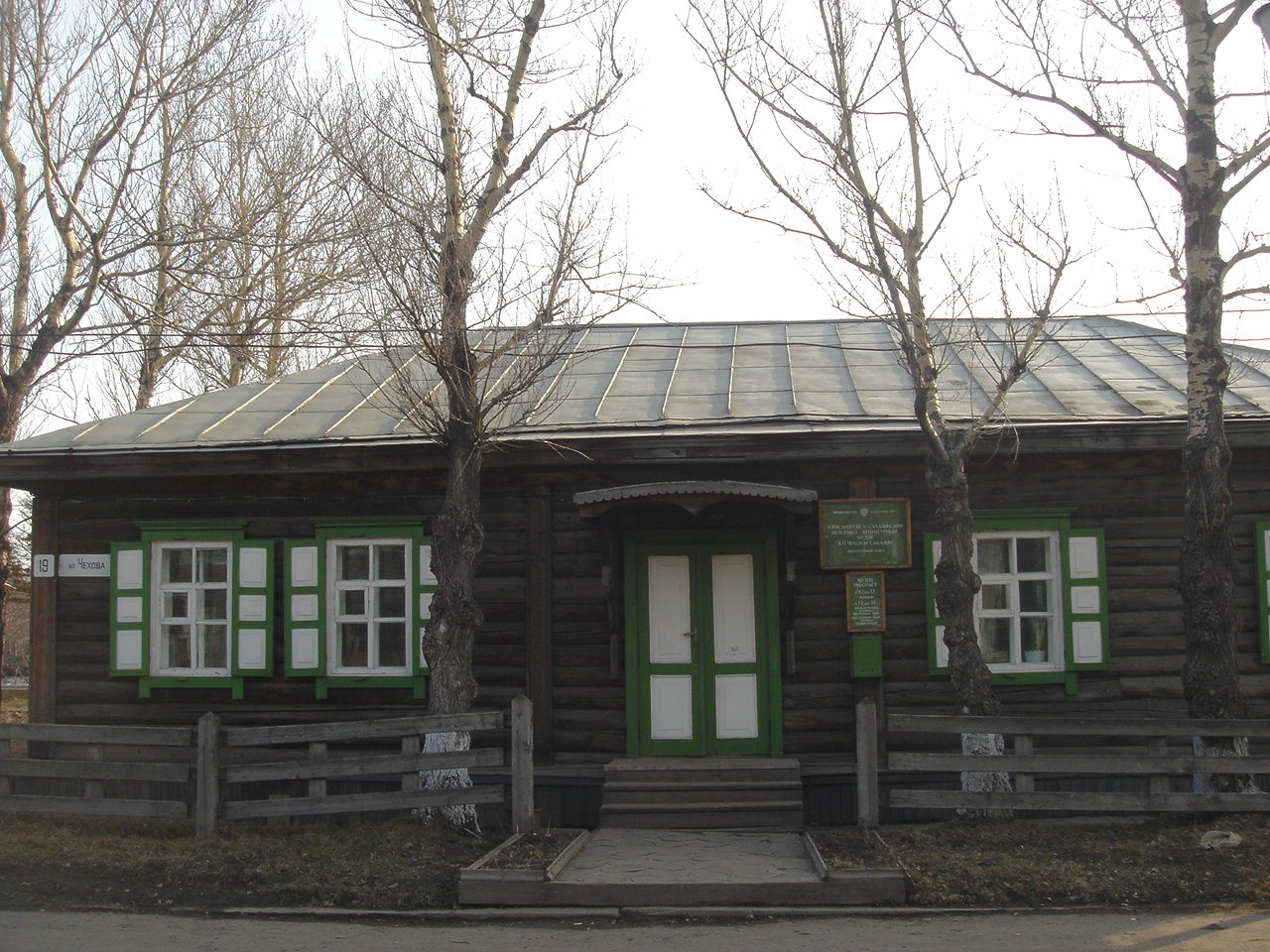
Anton Chekhov museum in Alexandrovsk-Sakhalinsky. It is the house where he stayed in Sakhalin during 1890.

After the Russian Revolution and subsequent civil war northern Sakhalin ultimately became governed by the Russian SFSR as a part of Far Eastern Oblast (1922–1926), Far Eastern Krai (1926–1938) and Khabarovsk Krai (included Russian-administered territories of Sakhalin in 1938–1947). Sakhalin Oblast was established on 20 October 1932 as a part of Far Eastern Krai, and became part of Khabarovsk Krai upon the latter foundation in 1938.

=== World War II ===
In August 1945, the Soviet Union took over the control of the entire Sakhalin and Kuril Islands. The Soviet attack on South Sakhalin started on August 11, 1945, about a month before the Surrender of Japan in World War II. The 56th Rifle Corps consisting of the 79th Rifle Division, the 2nd Rifle Brigade, the 5th Rifle Brigade and the 214th Tank Brigade attacked the Japanese 88th Division. Although the Red Army outnumbered the Japanese by three times, they could not advance due to strong Japanese resistance. It was not until the 113th Rifle Brigade and the 365th Independent Naval Infantry Rifle Battalion from Sovietskaya Gavan (Советская Гавань) landed on Tōrō (塔路), a seashore village of western Sakhalin on August 16 that the Soviets broke the Japanese defense line. Japanese resistance grew weaker after this landing. Actual fighting continued until August 21. However, this was relatively limited in scope. From August 22 to August 23, most of the remaining Japanese units set truce agreements with the Soviet Army. The Soviets completed the conquest of Sakhalin on August 25, 1945, by occupying the capital of Sakhalin, then known as Toyohara. Japanese sources claim that 20,000 civilians were killed during the invasion.

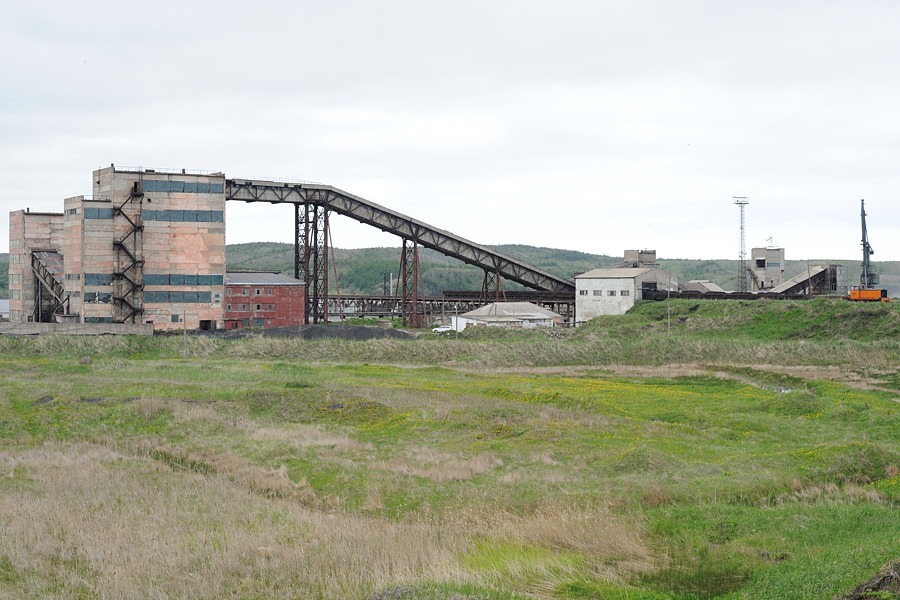
Shakhtyorsk narrow gauge railway 750 mm (2 ft 5 1/2 in), Central Processing Plant in Shakhtyorsk

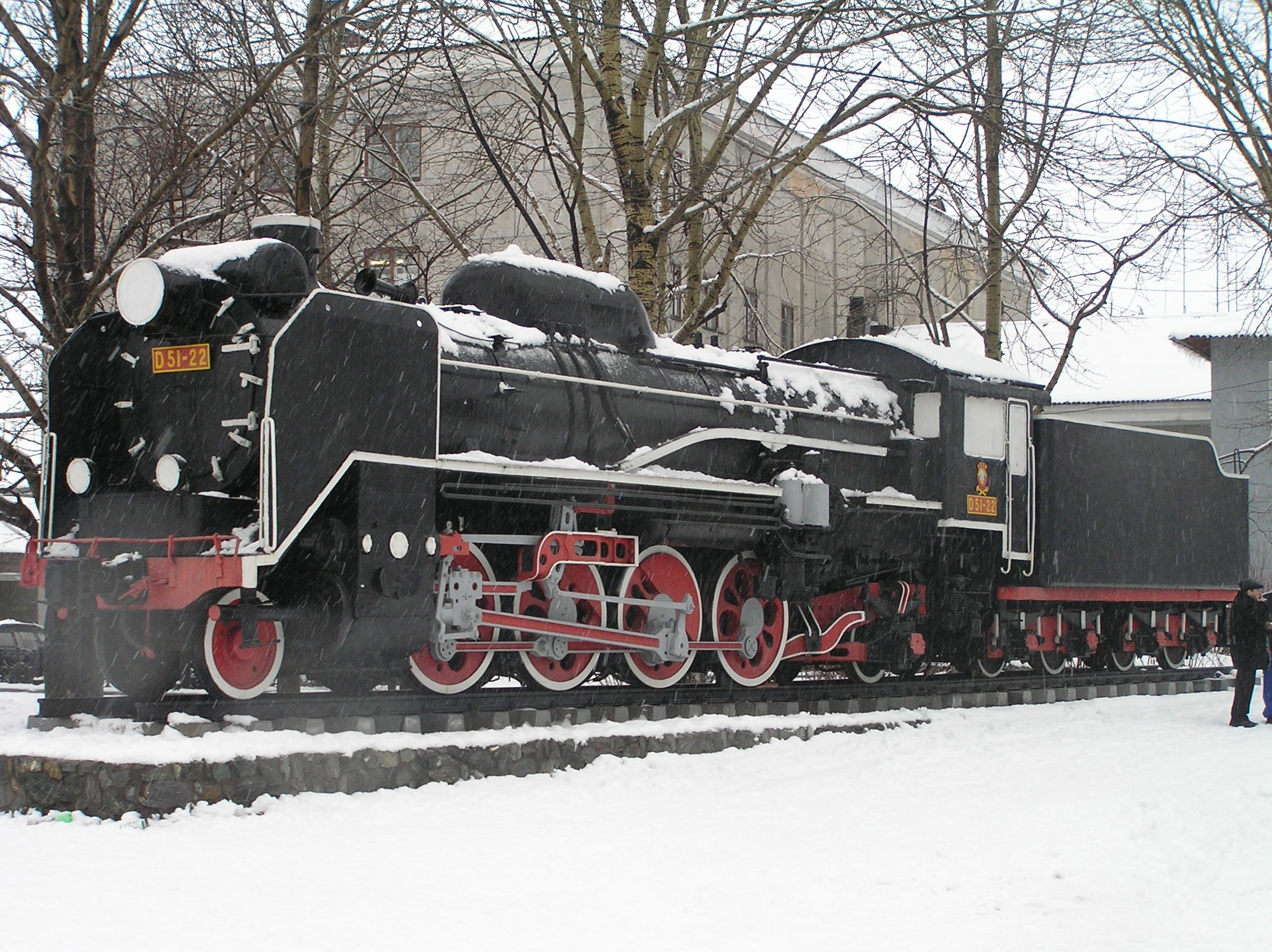
This Japanese D51 steam locomotive stands outside present day Yuzhno-Sakhalinsk Railway Station Sakhalin Island, Russia.

=== Post-war ===
Soviet-conquered areas of South Sakhalin and Kuril Islands were declared a South Sakhalin Oblast by the Soviet authorities in a decree issued on 2 February 1946. Almost a year later, on January 2, 1947, the South Sakhalin Oblast was disbanded and included into Sakhalin Oblast, forming present-day boundary of the latter. On the same day Sakhalin Oblast was excluded from Khabarovsk Krai. The Japanese who had been living there before mostly repatriated to Japan, but at least one-third of Koreans were refused repatriation; stuck on the island, they and their descendants became known as the Sakhalin Koreans. The Karafuto Prefecture was abolished by Japan as a legal entity on June 1, 1949.

The Treaty of San Francisco (1952) provides, that Japan renounces "all right, title and claim to the Kurile Islands, and to that portion of Sakhalin and the islands adjacent to it over which Japan acquired sovereignty as a consequence of the Treaty of Portsmouth of September 5, 1905". However, the status of the southern Kuril Islands remains disputed, as Japan does not consider them to be a part of the Kuril Islands (calling them "Northern Territories" instead) and, thus, claims sovereignty over them as "unaffected" by the 1952 renunciation. The issue remains a major strain on Japanese-Russian relations. Even now, no official peace treaty has been signed between the two nations.

In addition, because the treaty did not explicitly specify cession of the renounced areas to the Soviet Union, Japan officially considers South Sakhalin and northern Kuril Islands to be a territories of undetermined ownership and these areas are marked as No Man's Land with white color on Japanese maps, although Japan currently has a Consulate-General in Sakhalin's capital city of Yuzhno-Sakhalinsk, located on the renounced territory.

On September 1, 1983, the Soviets downed Korean Air Lines Flight 007, carrying 269 occupants, including U.S. Congressman Larry McDonald, west of Sakhalin Island near the smaller Moneron Island.

In 1995 the 7.0 M_{w} Neftegorsk earthquake shook the former settlement of Neftegorsk with a maximum Mercalli intensity of IX (Violent). Total damage was $64.1–300 million, with 1,989 deaths and 750 injured. The settlement was not rebuilt. On 24 April 1996 Sakhalin Oblast, alongside Rostov Oblast, signed a power-sharing agreement with the federal government, granting it autonomy. This agreement would be abolished on 4 March 2002.

=== Post-war population ===
According to the first post World War II Soviet Census in 1959, the population of the oblast numbered 649,405. That figure dropped slightly to 615,652 in 1970 before rising to 661,778 in 1979 and peaking at 710,242 in 1989. Throughout this time period, the Russian population increased slightly in percentage from 77.7% in 1959 to 81.6% in 1989. Following the collapse of the Soviet Union in 1991, the population of the oblast has declined sharply. Compared with the Soviet 1989 Census, the population of the Oblast according to the Russian 2002 Census had declined by 163,547 or 23.0%, to 546,695. The 2010 population of 497,973 recorded in 2010 is the lowest on record since the oblast was created, although the decline was less (8.9%) than during the 1990s.

==== Ainu ====
As of the 2002 census, 333 residents of the oblast still identified themselves as ethnic Japanese.

Most of the 888 Japanese people living in Russia (2010 Census) are also of mixed Japanese-Ainu ancestry, although they do not acknowledge it (full Japanese ancestry gives them the right of visa-free entry to Japan).

=== Oil, gas, and coal ===
Several Russian, French, South Korean, British, Canadian and American oil and gas companies have been either drilling or prospecting for oil and gas on the island since the mid-1990s. Coal and some manganese had been mined there by the Soviet authorities since the 1920s.

== Politics ==
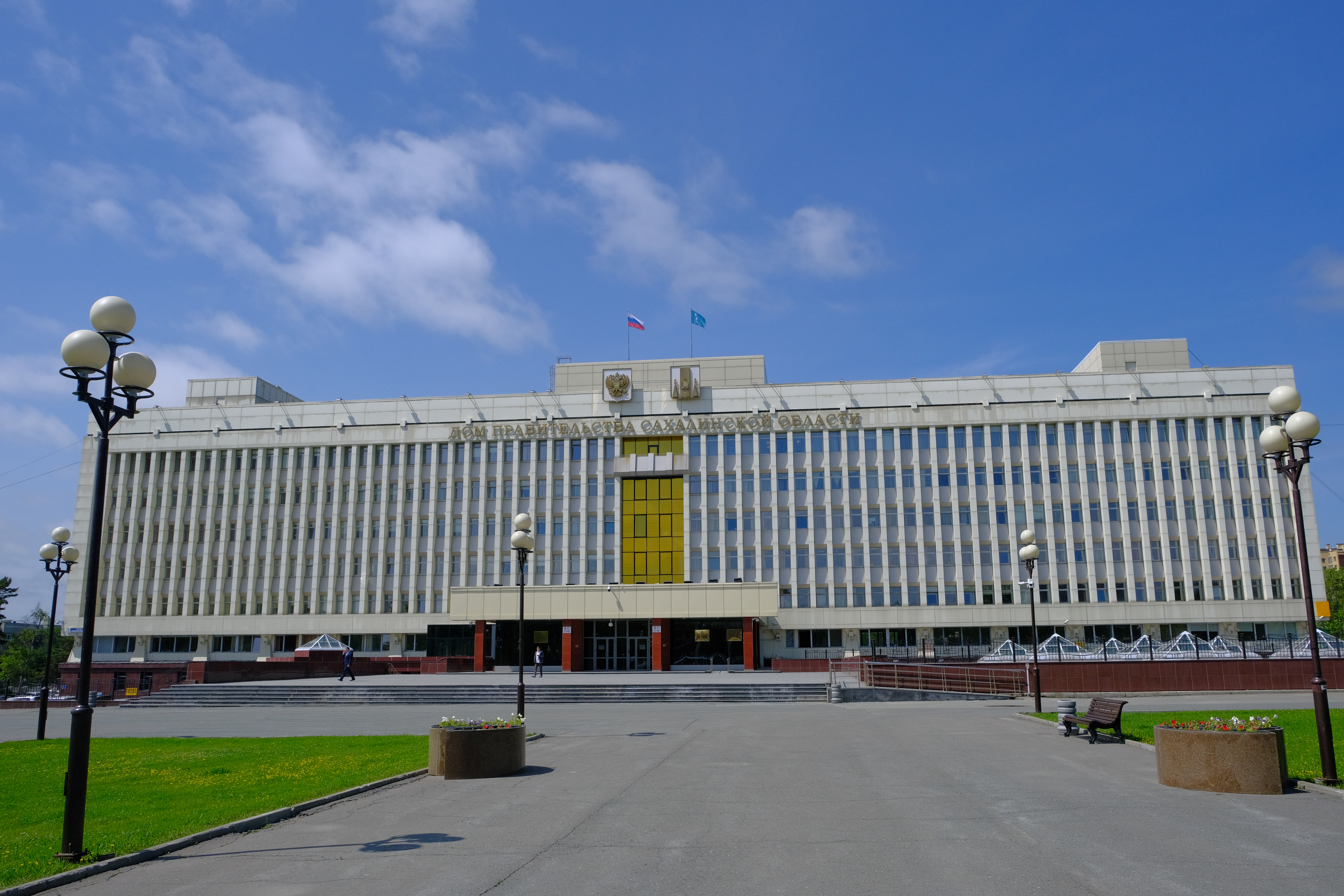
The building of the Sakhalin Oblast Government House, Yuzhno-Sakhalinsk, Russia

The governor Alexander Khoroshavin was appointed on August 9, 2007. He was succeeded by Oleg Kozhemyako on March 25, 2015, in 2018 he was replaced by Valery Limarenko.

== Administrative divisions ==
Division	Structure		OKATO	OKTMO	Urban-type settlement/ district-level town*	Rural
Division	Administrative	Municipal	OKATO	OKTMO	Urban-type settlement/ district-level town*	Rural
Yuzhno-Sakhalinsk (Южно-Сахалинск)	city	urban okrug	64 401	64 701		2 selsovets
Alexandrovsk-Sakhalinsky (Александровск-Сахалинский)	district	urban okrug	64 204	64 704	Alexandrovsk-Sakhalinsky (Александровск-Сахалинский) town*	5 rural okrugs
Anivsky (Анивский)	district	urban okrug	64 208	64 708	Aniva (Анива) town*	4 rural okrugs
Dolinsky (Долинский)	district	urban okrug	64 212	64 712	Dolinsk (Долинск) town*	7 rural okrugs
Korsakovsky (Корсаковский)	district	urban okrug	64 216	64 716	Korsakov (Корсаков) town*	5 rural okrugs
Kurilsky (Курильский)	district	urban okrug	64 220	64 720	Kurilsk (Курильск) town*	2 selsovets
Makarovsky (Макаровский)	district	urban okrug	64 224	64 724	Makarov (Макаров) town*	2 rural okrugs
Nevelsky (Невельский)	district	urban okrug	64 228	64 728	Nevelsk (Невельск) town*	4 rural territorial formations
Nogliksky (Ногликский)	district	urban okrug	64 232	64 732	Nogliki (Ноглики)	
Okhinsky (Охинский)	district	urban okrug	64 236	64 736	Okha (Оха) town*	4 selsovets
Poronaysky (Поронайский)	district	urban okrug	64 240	64 740	Poronaysk (Поронайск) town*; Vakhrushev (Вахрушев)	3 rural okrugs
Severo-Kurilsky (Северо-Курильский)	district	urban okrug	64 243	64 743	Severo-Kurilsk (Северо-Курильск)	
Smirnykhovsky (Смирныховский)	district	urban okrug	64 246	64 746	Smirnykh (Смирных)	6 rural administrations
Tomarinsky (Томаринский)	district	urban okrug	64 248	64 748	Tomari (Томари)	3 rural okrugs
Tymovsky (Тымовский)	district	urban okrug	64 250	64 750	Tymovskoye (Тымовское)	9 rural okrugs
Uglegorsky (Углегорский)	district	urban okrug	64 252	64 752	Uglegorsk (Углегорск) town*; Shakhtyorsk (Шахтёрск)	1 rural okrug
Kholmsky (Холмский)	district	urban okrug	64 254	64 754	Kholmsk (Холмск) town*	3 rural administrations
Yuzhno-Kurilsky (Южно-Курильский)	district	urban okrug	64 256	64 756	Yuzhno-Kurilsk (Южно-Курильск)	3 rural okrugs

== Tourism ==
Due to restrictions, the entire Sakhalin Oblast and its internal and territorial waters except for Yuzhno-Sakhalinsk are considered to be a border zone, which means that the freedom of movement for foreigners is dramatically restricted and any movement outside of Yuzhno-Sakhalinsk requires registration to the Federal Security Service (FSB) and the Border Guard. Scuba diving and recreation on the seacoast is permitted only in places defined by the Border Guard.

== Demographics ==
Population: According to the 2021 census, there were 466,609 people residing in Sakhalin Oblast. The population density was 5.4 inhabitants per square kilometre (14/sq mi). 82.4% lived in urban areas. The annual population growth stood at −0.6% (2010-21).

Historical population
Year	Pop.	±% p.a.
1897	28,113	—
1926	11,859	−2.93%
1939	99,925	+17.82%
1959	649,405	+9.81%
1970	615,652	−0.48%
1979	654,915	+0.69%
1989	709,629	+0.81%
2002	546,695	−1.99%
2010	497,973	−1.16%
2021	466,609	−0.59%
Source: Census data

Vital statistics for 2024:

- Births: 4,472 (9.8 per 1,000)
- Deaths: 6,477 (14.2 per 1,000)

Total fertility rate (2024):
1.73 children per woman

Life expectancy (2021):
Total — 68.42 years (male — 63.72, female — 73.41)

Ethnic groups:

Ethnicity	2010 census		2021 census	
Ethnicity	Number	%	Number	%
Russians	409,786	86.5%	394,794	91.2%
Sakhalin Koreans	24,993	5.3%	16,060	3.7%
Ukrainians	12,136	2.6%	3,634	0.8%
Tatars	4,880	1.0%	2,295	0.5%
Kyrgyz	1,763	0.4%	1,954	0.5%
Nivkh	2,290	0.5%	1,848	0.4%
Japanese or Ainu	219	0.05%	93	0.02%
Others	17,871	3.6%	12,198	2.8%
Ethnicity not stated	24,035	–	33,733	–

Most inhabitants are descendants of Russian and other Slavic settlers. The indigenous Ainu people have historically inhabited the southern part of Sakhalin Island, with only a small number remaining today. The Ainu are not recognized as a separate ethnic group in the Russian census, making it difficult to estimate their total population. Another indigenous group, the Nivkh people, live mainly in the north of the island and amount for roughly 2,000 people. There exists a notable minority of Sakhalin Koreans, who can trace their roots to the immigrants from the Gyeongsang and Jeolla provinces of Korea during the late 1930s and early 1940s, the latter half of the Japanese ruling era. After the Red Army had seized control over southern Sakhalin at the end of WW2, all but a few Japanese there repatriated successfully, while most Koreans could not secure permission to depart either to Japan or their home towns in South Korea. In 2021, there were roughly 16,000 Sakhalin Koreans, down from 25,000 in the 2010 census and 42,000 in the 1959 census.

=== Religion ===
Religion in Sakhalin Oblast as of 2012 (Sreda Arena Atlas)
Russian Orthodoxy	21.6%
Other Orthodox	1.8%
Protestantism	0.6%
Other Christians	4.4%
Rodnovery and other native faiths	1.4%
Spiritual but not religious	37%
Atheism and irreligion	15.4%
Other and undeclared	17.8%

According to a 2012 survey 21.6% of the population of Sakhalin Oblast adheres to the Russian Orthodox Church, 4% are unaffiliated generic Christians, 2% adheres to other Orthodox churches or is an Orthodox believer without belonging to any church, 1% of the population adheres to the Slavic native faith (Rodnovery) or to local Siberian native faiths, 1% adheres to forms of Protestantism. In addition, 37% of the population declares to be "spiritual but not religious", 15% is atheist, and 18.4% follows other religions or did not give an answer to the question.
