= Alexandrovsk-Sakhalinsky District =

Alexandrovsk-Sakhalinsky District Александровск-Сахалинский район (Russian)
- District
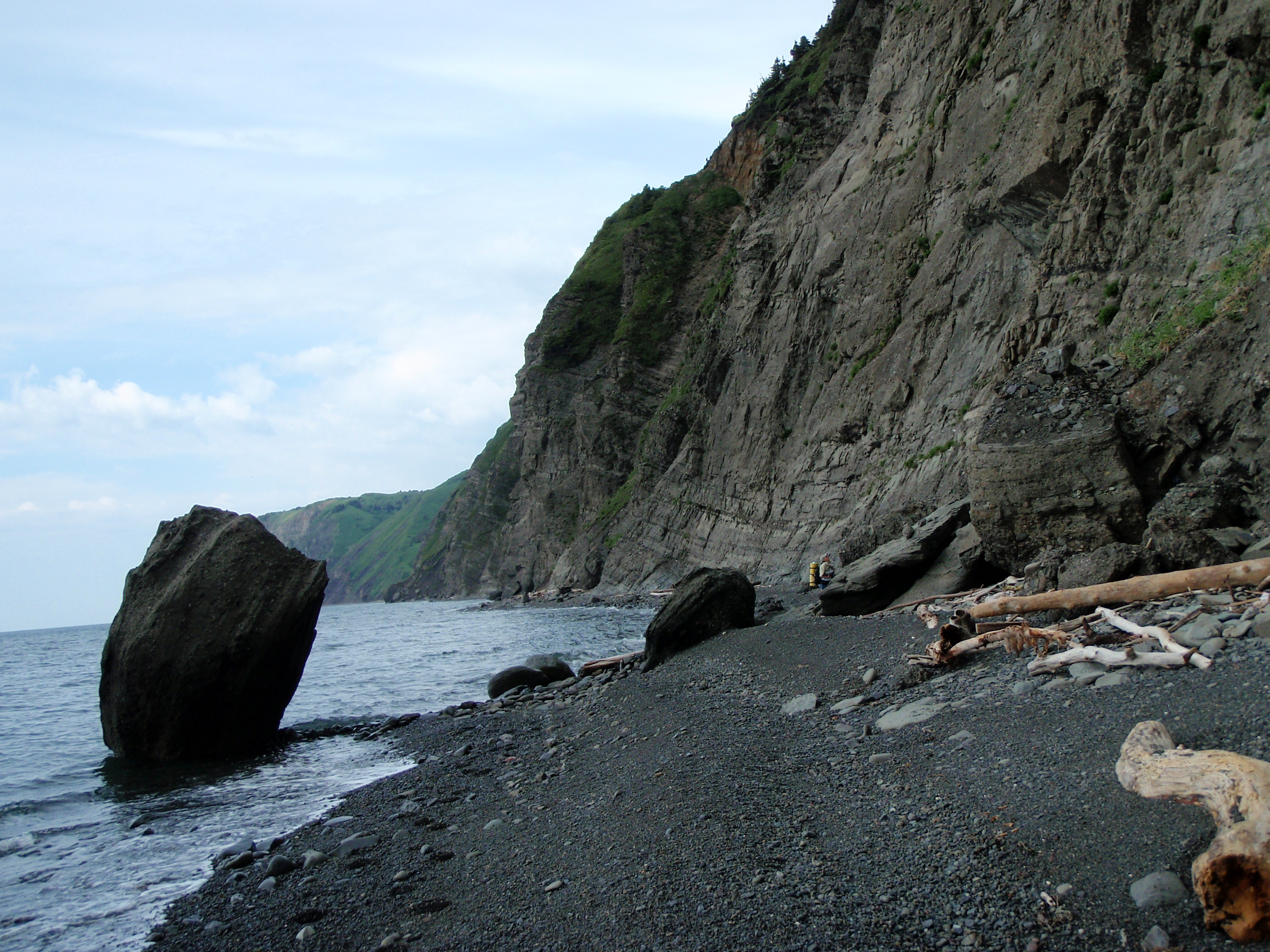
- Coastal landscape, Alexandrovsk-Sakhalinsky District

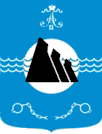
- Flag Coat of arms
- Location of Alexandrovsk-Sakhalinsky District in Sakhalin Oblast
- Coordinates: 50°54′N 142°09′E
- Country: Russia
- Federal subject: Sakhalin Oblast
- Administrative center: Alexandrovsk-Sakhalinsky

Area
  - Total: 4,777.4 km^{2} (1,844.6 sq mi)

Population (2010 Census)
  - Total: 2,791
  - Density: 0.5842/km^{2} (1.513/sq mi)
  - Urban: 0%
  - Rural: 100%

Administrative structure
  - Inhabited localities: 1 cities/towns, 13 rural localities

Municipal structure
  - Municipally incorporated as: Alexandrovsk-Sakhalinsky Urban Okrug
- Time zone: UTC+11 (MSK+8)
- OKTMO ID: 64704000
- Website: http://www.aleks-sakh.ru/

Alexandrovsk-Sakhalinsky District (Russian: Алекса́ндровск-Сахали́нский райо́н) is an administrative district (raion) of Sakhalin Oblast, Russia, one of the seventeen in the oblast. As a municipal division, it is incorporated as Alexandrovsk-Sakhalinsky Urban Okrug. It is located in the west of the oblast. The area of the district is 4,777.4 square kilometers (1,844.6 sq mi). Its administrative center is the town of Alexandrovsk-Sakhalinsky. Population (excluding the administrative center): 2,791 (2010 census); 4,687 (2002 census); 8,526 (1989 Soviet census).

Historical population
Year	Pop.	±%
1959	42,593	—
1970	35,862	−15.8%
1979	29,256	−18.4%
1989	27,810	−4.9%
2002	17,513	−37.0%
2010	13,404	−23.5%
2021	10,221	−23.7%
Source: Census data

== Sources ==
- Сахалинская областная Дума. Закон №25-ЗО от 23 марта 2011 г. «Об административно-территориальном устройстве Сахалинской области», в ред. Закона №62-ЗО от 27 июня 2013 г. «О внесении изменения в статью 10 Закона Сахалинской области "Об административно-территориальном устройстве Сахалинской области"». Вступил в силу 9 апреля 2011 г.. Опубликован: "Губернские ведомости", №55(3742), 29 марта 2011 г. (Sakhalin Oblast Duma. Law #25-ZO of March 23, 2011 On the Administrative-Territorial Structure of Sakhalin Oblast, as amended by the Law #62-ZO of June 27, 2013 On Amending Article 10 of the Law of Sakhalin Oblast "On the Administrative-Territorial Structure of Sakhalin Oblast". Effective as of April 9, 2011.).
- Сахалинская областная Дума. Закон №524 от 21 июля 2004 г. «О границах и статусе муниципальных образований в Сахалинской области», в ред. Закона №45-ЗО от 27 мая 2013 г. «О внесении изменения в Закон Сахалинской области "О границах и статусе муниципальных образований в Сахалинской области"». Вступил в силу 1 января 2005 г. Опубликован: "Губернские ведомости", №175–176(2111–2112), 31 июля 2004 г. (Sakhalin Oblast Duma. Law #524 of July 21, 2004 On the Borders and Status of the Municipal Formations in Sakhalin Oblast, as amended by the Law #45-ZO of May 27, 2013 On Amending the Law of Sakhalin Oblast "On the Borders and Status of the Municipal Formations in Sakhalin Oblast". Effective as of January 1, 2005.).
