= Karafuto Fortress =

Japanese WWII fortification

The Karafuto Fortress was the defensive unit formed by the Karafuto fortification installations, and the Karafuto detachment of Japanese forces, the 88th Division, created to defend against the Soviet invasion of South Sakhalin.

The headquarters was in Toyohara, capital of the province, based on the Suzuya plain, in the Southern Karafuto area, not far from the ports of Otomari and Maoka.

== Conformation of Fortified district in Karafuto Prefecture ==
One example of such defensive structure was in Japanese fortifications to the north of Koton (Naramitoshi) Fortress (now Pobedino) part of Shikuka Fortified District (FD). It extended twelve kilometers along the front and was thirty kilometers deep, between the cities of Hanno, Futaro, Horomi, Miyuki and Horonai with central command in Koton. In this area, along the principal railroad that crossed the island from north to south, there were 17 permanent emplacements, 31 artillery and 108 machine gun bunkers, 28 artillery and 18 mortar positions and 150 shelters, these installations was constructed by Obishiro Nayaro in 1939 over ancient fortifications from the Russian-Japanese War period. The Karafuto Mixed Brigade protecting the fortified district was expanded 28 February to 88th Division. Together with support units it numbered up to 20,000 officers and men. The Japanese had 10,000 Military veterans serving as reservists and civil volunteer defenders. This structure was very similar in the following areas:

- Toyohara Fortified District
- Toyo-Sakae Fortified District
- Otomari Fortified District
- Rutaka Fortified District
- Honto Fortified District
- Maoka Fortified District
- Tomarioru Fortified District
- Motodomari Fortified District
- Shikuka Fortified District
- Esutoru Fortified District
- Kita Nayoshi Fortified District

additionally including airbases, Naval bases, some Army or Navy detachments and others, along with civil defence units inland.

== Karafuto Fortification system ==
Special frontier unit with HQ in Toyohara and detachments and fortified installations in:

=== Southern Karafuto Fortress area ===
==== Toyohara Sub-Prefecture ====
Toyohara Fortified District

- 3 detachments
- 3 fortifications
- 1 airfield

==== Otomari Sub-Prefecture ====
Toyo-Sakae Fortified District

- 1 detachment
- 4 fortifications
- 1 airfield

Otomari Fortified District

- 2 detachments
- 5 fortifications
- 1 airfield
- 1 naval base

Rutaka Fortified District

- 2 fortifications
- 1 airfield

==== Maoka Sub-Prefecture ====
Honto Fortified District

- 2 fortifications
- 1 airfield

Maoka Fortified District

- 2 fortifications
- 1 airfield
- 1 Naval Base

Tomarioru Fortified District

- 1 detachment

=== Northern Karafuto Fortress Area ===
==== Shikuka Sub-Prefecture ====
Mototomari Fortified District

- 5 fortifications

Shikuka Fortified District

- 3 airfields
- 7 fortifications
- 2 detachments
- 3 frontier posts

==== Esutoru Sub-Prefecture ====
Esutoru Fortified District

- 7 fortifications
- 1 detachment
- 1 airfield

Kita Nayoshi Fortified District

- 3 fortifications
- 1 frontier post

== Karafuto Detachment ==
- 88th Division HQ. (Toyohara) (Lt. Gen. Junichiro Mineki)
  - 25th Infantry Regiment
  - 125th Infantry Regiment
  - 306th Infantry Regiment
  - 88th Mountain Gun Regiment
  - 88th Signals company
  - 88th Transport Regiment
- 88th Railway Guards Unit
- 351st Special Guards Battalion
- 352nd Special Guards Battalion
- 353rd Special Guards Battalion
- 301st Special Guards Company
- 303rd Special Guards Engineer Unit
- 50th Infantry Battalion (served as Koton Fortress detachment)

== Japanese Navy detachments in Karafuto ==
Japanese naval forces, had some bases and infantry naval detachments in Maoka (front at the Strait of Tartary) and Otomari (in Aniwa Gulf) ports, the principal ports in Karafuto. Probably there were some units in ports in coasts of Taraika Bay, and city of Esutoru at north of province.
