= Russian Multi-Purpose Salvage Vessels =

Russian multi-purpose salvage vessels include the following ship classes:

- Project MPSV06 salvage ship
- Project MPSV07 salvage ship
- Project MPSV12 salvage ship
