= Project MPSV12 salvage ship =

Class overview
- Builders: Nevsky Shipyard (Shlisselburg, Russia); Oka Shipyard (Navashino, Russia)
- Operators: (Russia) Rosmorrechflot Marine Rescue Service
- Built: 2015–present
- In service: 2019–present
- Planned: 5
- Building: 1
- Completed: 4

General characteristics (for Bakhtemir)
- Type: Salvage ship
- Tonnage: 3,030 GT; 909 NT; 1,936 DWT
- Displacement: 4,573 t (4,501 long tons)
- Length: 79.85 m (262.0 ft)
- Beam: 16.86 m (55.3 ft)
- Draught: 4.50 m (14.8 ft)
- Ice class: RS Arc5
- Installed power: 2 × Wärtsilä 8L26F (2 × 2,610 kW)
- Propulsion: Two controllable pitch propellers; Two bow thrusters (2 × 790 kW) and one stern thruster (790 kW)
- Speed: 14 knots (26 km/h; 16 mph)
- Range: 4,000 nautical miles (7,400 km; 4,600 mi)
- Endurance: 30 days
- Capacity: 430 m^{2} (4,600 sq ft) cargo deck; 87 survivors
- Crew: 12 crew (36 berths)

Project MPSV12 salvage ships are a series of Russian ice-strengthened multipurpose salvage ships. This class of vessels are bigger than Project MPSV07 salvage ships but smaller than the Project MPSV06 salvage ships. The first four vessels of this class were named after the Russian rivers Bakhtemir, Kalas, Beysug, Piltun, and Aldan.

== Design ==
The vessels are about 80 m long and deadweight at maximum draft is approximately 1,820 t.

== Ships in class ==
Name	Builder	Yard number	IMO number	Keel laid	Launched	Delivered	Port of registry	Status	Image	Ref
Bakhtemir	Nevsky Shipyard	1201	9797577	2 June 2015	19 August 2016	28 June 2019	Saint Petersburg	In service		
Kalas	Nevsky Shipyard	1202	9797589	2 June 2015	29 November 2016	28 January 2020	Korsakov	In service		
Beysug	Nevsky Shipyard	1203	9797591	16 December 2015	1 June 2017	26 December 2020	Novorossiysk	In service		
Piltun	Nevsky Shipyard	1204	9797606	11 March 2016	30 November 2017	15 December 2021	Arkhangelsk	In service		
Aldan	Oka Shipyard	2101	9986960	11 November 2021	April 2025 (planned)	2024 (planned)	Murmansk	Under construction		
