= Denis Gorin =

Russian serial killer and cannibal

- Born: Denis Vladimirovich Gorin; 15 November 1979; Komsomolsk-on-Amur, Khabarovsk Krai, RSFSR
- Died: 1 July 2024 (aged 44)
- Convictions: Murder x4 Desecration of a corpse
- Penalty: 10 years imprisonment (2003); 20 years and 10 months imprisonment (2013); 22 years imprisonment (2018)

Details
- Victims: 4+
- Span of crimes: 2002–2012
- Country: Russia
- State: Sakhalin
- Date apprehended: For the final time on 15 January 2012

Denis Vladimirovich Gorin (Russian: Денис Владимирович Горин; 15 November 1979 – 1 July 2024) was a Russian serial killer and cannibal who, with the aid of his brother, committed at least four murders in the town of Aniva, Sakhalin Oblast, from 2002 to 2012. In 2018 he was sentenced to 22 years imprisonment.

In early 2023, while in a penal colony, Gorin signed a contract with a private military company (PMC) and was sent to Ukraine to participate in the Russian invasion of the country. Gorin fought in the ranks of the Storm-Z and was wounded during a battle, after which President Vladimir Putin pardoned him and allowed him to return to his hometown. This act sparked outrage across Russia, causing great debate about the morality of pardoning criminals to fight in the ongoing war. Gorin later died in the war.

== Early life ==
Very little is known about the early years of Denis Gorin's life. He was born on 15 November 1979, in Komsomolsk-on-Amur, Khabarovsk Krai, but later in life, his family moved to Aniva, in the Sakhalin Oblast. He has one brother named Evgeniy and a sister whose name is not known to the public.

While living in the town, Gorin was regarded well by locals, as he was not known to engage in any criminal activities or aggressive behaviours. After graduating from high school, he married and had two children, but the family began experiencing financial struggles later on due to Gorin's lack of higher education. In the early 2000s, Gorin became an alcoholic and started living on the streets.

== Murders ==
=== First murder and imprisonment ===
In late 2002, the then-23-year-old Gorin committed his first known murder, with the victim being an acquaintance of his. He was arrested a short time later and charged with murder and desecrating a corpse. At trial, Gorin stated that after killing the victim, he cut off the soft tissues of his body and then ate them, claiming that he had done so under the threats of his brother Evgeniy, an accomplice who threatened to kill him if he didn't cannibalize the victim.

On 6 March 2003, Gorin was sentenced to 9 years and 11 months imprisonment in a strict regime colony, which he served at an undisclosed location in the Irkutsk Oblast. After serving seven years, he was paroled on 19 April 2010, and returned to Aniva, where he continued to live on the streets for the next two years. During this period, he never worked and earned his money by doing odd jobs and stealing, spending most of his time among other homeless people and alcoholics.

=== Serial murders ===
In June 2011, the Gorin brothers became enraged after learning that their nephew had been abused by an acquaintance, after which they went to the apartment to confront him. However, once they got inside, they instead beat up a young man, who was not involved, to the point of unconsciousness. Taking advantage of the fact that he was knocked out, Denis proceeded to slit his throat. After that, the two brothers carried the body to the bank of the Lyutoga River, where they buried it in a shallow grave. The victim's body was discovered in the spring of 2012.

The next murder the brothers committed took place during the celebration of the Old New Year, on the night of 14–15 January 2012. The two were at the "Cheremushki" store when they got into some sort of conflict with an acquaintance, whom Denis proceeded to stab at least 29 times with a knife; the man would later succumb to the injuries. That same day, Gorin was arrested by the police and immediately began confessing. On 27 February 2013, he was convicted of the two murders and sentenced to 20 years and 10 months imprisonment. His brother Evgeniy did not live to see the trial; in mid-2012, he died while incarcerated at a temporary detention centre in Aniva under unclear circumstances.

=== Confession to unsolved murder ===
After the trial, Gorin was transferred to a penal colony. In June 2017, he contacted the Sakhalin Oblast Prosecutor's Office and confessed to an unsolved murder, after which he was transported back to Aniva to give testimony. According to him, this killing was committed on 21 November 2010, with the victim being another acquaintance named Alexander, whose brother Denis had been incarcerated at a temporary detention centre from 25 February to 6 March 2003. While drinking together, Gorin recalled an incident that seemed amusing to him: while he and Alexander's brother had been incarcerated at the detention centre, a drunken Alexander attempted to deliver a parcel to his brother but was detained for disorderly conduct because of his state of intoxication. Alexander seemed to be annoyed by this story, causing them to have an argument and separate.

That same evening, after attending his ex-wife's birthday party, an intoxicated Gorin decided to go to Alexander's house to resolve their argument from earlier. However, they instead continued arguing, whereupon Gorin grabbed a knife and stabbed Alexander twice in the chest. After killing him, he then cut pieces of his biceps, calves, and thighs, which he proceeded to eat. Gorin then dragged the corpse to the Lyutoga River, where he undressed it, picked it up, and dragged it into the water, leaving it at a considerable distance from the shore. Gorin then returned to his ex-wife's birthday party, which was still ongoing. Despite leaving for approximately 35–40 minutes, apparently nobody had noticed Gorin's absence. When asked why he ate pieces of his victim's remains, Gorin simply said that he had developed a taste for human flesh after committing his first murder back in 2002.

In the following months, however, he recanted his testimony and claimed that the police had tortured him into confessing out of fear of further reprisals against him and pressure against his family members. However, the overwhelming amount of evidence proved that he had indeed committed the murder, and on 27 June 2018, Gorin was given 22 years imprisonment. He avoided receiving life imprisonment due to his initial confession and cooperation with law enforcement, and he was even given time served by the district court. With this taken into account, he was scheduled for release in 2032.

=== Possible additional victims ===
Gorin's true victim count has been the subject of much debate, with some of his neighbours claiming that he had confessed to them that he had killed at least 13 people. The testimony of one such neighbour, known only as "Dmitry Vladimirovich," stated that after being arrested in 2012, officers opened a refrigerator and found an abundance of human meat in there. "Dmitry" also claimed that the two brothers had attempted to kill another local in a drunken stupor and that Denis once took him to a pit where he claimed to have buried the remains of 12 people; the pit supposedly had multiple skeletons, including that of what appeared to be a young girl.

Local authorities have never commented officially on these claims, and it is unclear if any investigations into further victims ever took place.

== Pardon and death ==
In early 2023, Gorin, while still incarcerated in a penal colony, signed a contract with a PMC and was sent to fight in Ukraine as part of a Storm-Z penal battalion. In the summer or early fall of 2023, he received a moderate injury in combat, after which President Putin pardoned him. The pardon caused a public outcry across Russia, leading to the incident being covered nationally and even internationally.

On 24 October 2023, Gorin published a photo on his Odnoklassniki page dressed in a military uniform with a ribbon of Saint George and a patch with the inscription "Zacheburashim," similar to what volunteers wear on the Ukrainian front. Friends and acquaintances of Gorin stated that, after being wounded in battle, he was sent for treatment at a military hospital in Yuzhno-Sakhalinsk.

On 1 July 2024, he died of wounds received in the war. His death was not reported in the news until it was discovered by the independent Russian media outlet Mediazona on 2 August 2025.

== See also ==
- List of Russian serial killers
- List of incidents of cannibalism
