= Korsakov =

Korsakov or Korsakoff may refer to:

- Korsakov (surname), a surname
- Korsakov (town), a town in Sakhalin Oblast, Russia
- Korsakov (air base), a former Soviet Naval Aviation airfield near Korsakov

== See also ==
- Korsakoff's syndrome, a brain disease caused by chronic alcoholism named after Sergei Korsakoff
- Battle of Korsakov, a 1904 naval battle of the Russo-Japanese War
- Nikolai Rimsky-Korsakov (1844–1908), Russian composer
