= Lesogorsk =

Lesogorsk (Russian: Лесого́рск) is the name of several inhabited localities in Russia.

== Urban localities ==
- Lesogorsk, Irkutsk Oblast, a work settlement in Chunsky District of Irkutsk Oblast
- Lesogorsk (work settlement), Nizhny Novgorod Oblast, a work settlement in Shatkovsky District, Nizhny Novgorod Oblast

== Rural localities ==
- Lesogorsk (station settlement), Nizhny Novgorod Oblast, a station settlement under the administrative jurisdiction of the work settlement of Lesogorsk, Shatkovsky District, Nizhny Novgorod Oblast

== Historical names ==
- Lesogorsk, name of the selo of Lesogorskoye, Uglegorsky District, Sakhalin Oblast until 1993
