= Lyutoga =

River in Sakhalin Oblast, Russia

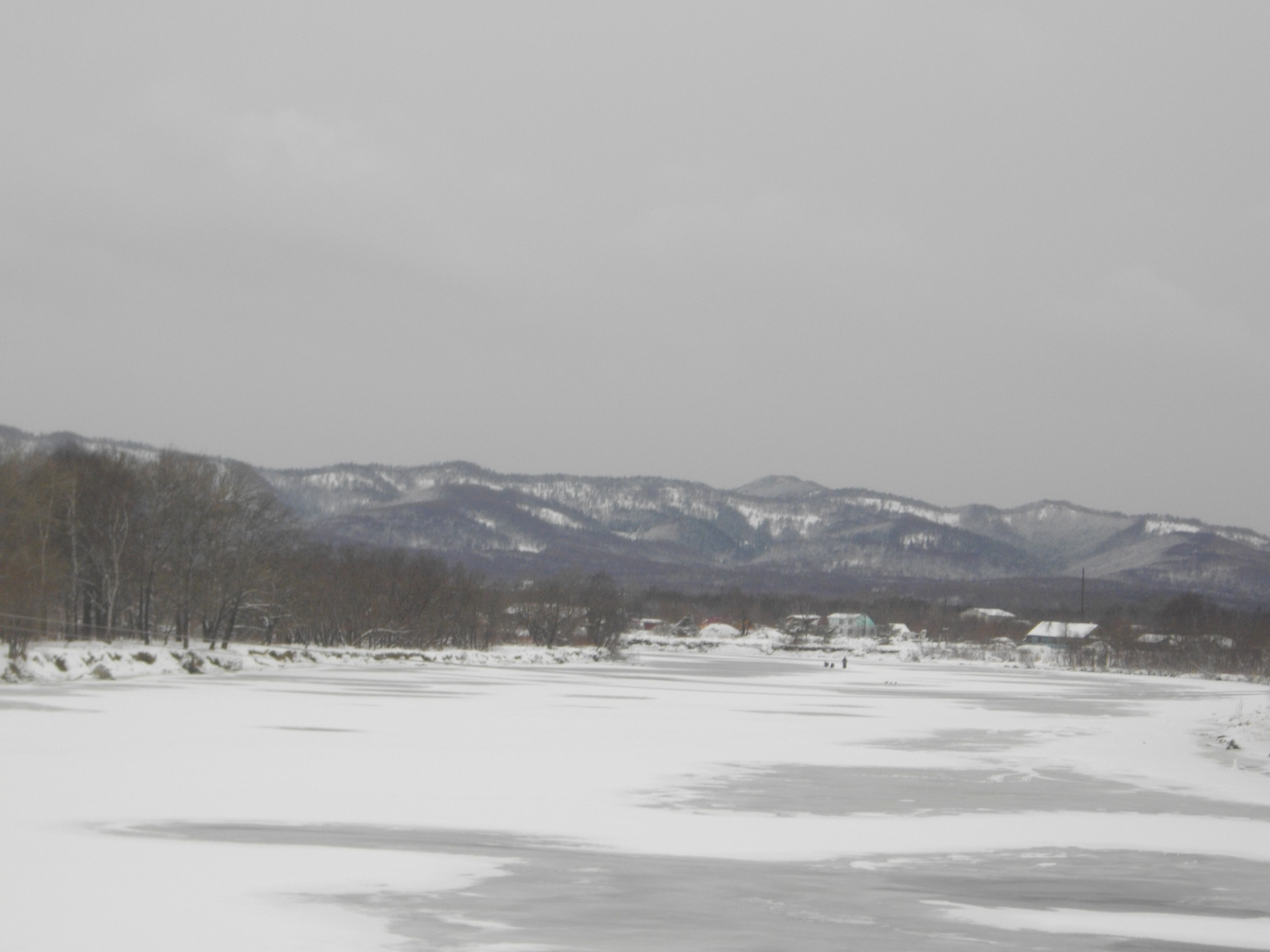

- Location of mouth

Location
- Country: Russia

Physical characteristics
- Mouth: Sea of Okhotsk
  - location: Aniva Bay
  - coordinates: 46.697318°N 142.530623°E
- Length: 130 km (81 mi)
- Basin size: 1,530 km^{2} (590 sq mi)

The Lyutoga (Russian: Лю́тога) is a river on the Russian island of Sakhalin. It flows through Kholmsk and Aniva districts of Sakhalin Oblast. Starting at the western slope of the Mitsulsky Mountain Ridge, which belongs to the system of Western Sakhalin Mountains. It flows along a wide valley from North to South, and discharges into the Aniva Bay of the Sea of Okhotsk. There is a town of Aniva (Russian: Ани́ва) (with population of ca. 8,100 people) in the mouth of the river, the town used to have the same name as the river before 1905. There are several comparatively large villages located on Lyutoga banks (upstream to downstream): Pyatirechie (Russian: Пятире́чье) (ca. 600), Chaplanovo (Russian: Чапла́ново) (ca. 900), Ogon'ki (Russian: Огоньки́) (ca. 400) and Petropavlovskoye (Russian: Петропа́вловское) (ca. 400).

The Lyutoga has a width near its mouth of 145 m, a length of 130 kilometres (81 mi), a drainage basin of 1,530 square kilometres (590 sq mi), an average inclination of 0,37%, average discharge (near Ogon'ki Village) of 31,7 m^{3}/s, and an average annual flow being about 1 km^{3}. The river is fed mainly by melting snow, with its highest level usually observed at the end of April and its lowest in the middle of September. From the beginning of December to the middle of April the river is covered in ice.

The largest tributaries (in brackets - length, km): right — Bystraya (Podgornaya) (42), Chipian (21), Kamenka (18), Okulovka (17); left — Tiobut (52), Bezymyanka (21), Chernozyomka (16), Naryan-Mar (16).
