= Sakhalin-II =

Oil and natural gas drilling project in Sakhalin Oblast, Russia

Piltun-Astokhskoye oil field Lunskoye natural gas field
- Location within Russia
- Country: Russia
- Region: Sakhalin
- Offshore/onshore: offshore
- Coordinates: 52°52′12″N 143°46′12″E
- Operator: Sakhalin Energy
- Partners: Gazprom, Mitsui & Co., Mitsubishi Corporation

Field history
- Discovery: 1984 (Lunskoye); 1986 (Piltun-Astokhskoye)
- Start of development: 1994
- Start of production: 1999

Production
- Current production of oil: 395,000 barrels per day (~1.97×10^{7} t/a)
- Current production of gas: 53×10^{6} m^{3}/d (1.9×10^{9} cu ft/d)
- Estimated oil in place: 1,200 million barrels (~1.6×10^{8} t)
- Estimated gas in place: 500×10^{9} m^{3} (18×10^{12} cu ft)
- Producing formations: Astokh feature

The Sakhalin-2 (Russian: Сахалин-2) project is an oil and gas development in Sakhalin Island, Russia. It includes development of the Piltun-Astokhskoye oil field and the Lunskoye natural gas field offshore Sakhalin Island in the Okhotsk Sea, and associated infrastructure onshore. The project is managed and operated by Sakhalin Energy Investment Company Ltd. (Sakhalin Energy).

Sakhalin-2 includes the first liquefied natural gas plant in Russia. The development is situated in areas previously little touched by human activity, causing various groups to criticize the development activities and the impact they have on the local environment.

== History ==
The original consortium, was a joint venture between Marathon Oil, McDermott, and Mitsubishi. They won a tender from the Russian Government in 1992. Later that year Royal Dutch Shell joined the joint venture. In 1994 the JV incorporated in Bermuda to form Sakhalin Energy Investment Company Ltd. Sakhalin Energy, led by Marathon, negotiated the first PSA directly with representatives of the Russian government. The Russian Party maintained project planning and budget approval. The initial investment decision was to proceed with the oil field development led by Marathon. McDermott sold its share to the other partners in 1997 and Marathon traded its shares to Shell for an interest in other properties (the BP operated Foinaven field, near the Shetland Islands, and an eight block area in the Gulf of Mexico—including the Ursa field) in 2000.

The decision to proceed with the gas project investment was made in 2003. The expected budget increased dramatically by 2005–2006. The pipeline portion of the gas project was heavily criticized due to environmental issues. Legal proceeding on perceived violation of the Russian environmental regulations were initiated. In the result, The Russian government ordered to terminate the project in September 2006. Under legal and political pressure, the consortium was forced to sell a majority stake to Gazprom. On 21 December, Gazprom took control over a 50%-plus-one-share stake in the project by signing an agreement with Royal Dutch Shell. Russian President Vladimir Putin attended the signing ceremony in Moscow and indicated that environmental issues had been resolved.

The LNG plant was inaugurated on 18 February 2009. The first cargo was loaded to the LNG carrier Grand Aniva at the end of March 2009.

After the Russian invasion of Ukraine in February 2022, Shell said that it would exit Sakhalin-2 and other ventures in Russia. On 30 June 2022, Russian President Vladimir Putin signed a decree ordering the transfer of the Sakhalin-2 project to a new domestic operator. Foreign investors will be required to apply to retain their existing shares in the new Russian company within a month. The Russian government will then decide whether to allow foreign shareholders to keep their stake. If they are rejected, the government will sell the foreign shareholder’s stake and keep the proceeds in the shareholder’s special account. In April 2023, the Russian government approved the sale of Shell's 27.5% stake to Novatek for RUB 94.8 billion. At the same time, Novatek secured the consent of President Putin so that Shell could withdraw these funds from Russia.

As marine insurance policies come up for renewal, the Japanese government has asked non-life insurance companies to offer war coverage to LNG shippers in Russian waters.

Sakhalin-II has been exempted from sanctions by the UK and US governments until June 28, 2024. The Office of Foreign Assets Control later announced the US would extend its exemption to June 18, 2026, provided any byproducts are solely exported to Japan.

== Technical features ==
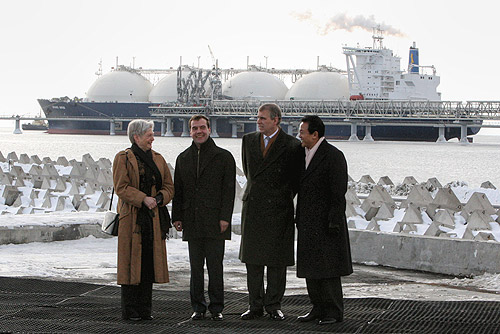
Dmitry Medvedev, Taro Aso, Prince Andrew, Duke of York and Maria van der Hoeven visit the Sakhalin-II project on 18 February 2009.

The two fields contain an estimated 1,200 million barrels (190×10^{6} m^{3}) of crude oil and 500 billion cubic meters (18 trillion cubic feet) of natural gas; 9.6 million tonnes of liquefied natural gas per year and about 180,000 barrels per day (29,000 m^{3}/d) of oil will be produced. The total project cost until 2014 was originally estimated by Royal Dutch Shell to be between US$9 and $11 billion. However, the costs turned out to be substantially underestimated and in July 2005 Shell revised the estimate upwards to $20 billion.

Sakhalin-2 project includes:

- Piltun-Astokhskoye-A platform (the Molikpaq, the PA-A)
- Lunskoye-A platform (the Lun-A)
- Piltun-Astokhskoye-B platform (the PA-B)
- Onshore processing facility
- TransSakhalin pipelines
- Oil export terminal
- LNG plant
- Plans for an additional platform (the PA-C)

=== Piltun-Astokhskoye-A platform ===
The Molikpaq drilling and oil production platform (Piltun-Astokhskoye-A platform) is an ice-resistant structure, originally built to explore for oil in the Canadian Beaufort Sea. It had been mothballed in 1990, and was installed in the Astokh area of the Piltun-Astokhskoye field, 16 kilometres (9.9 mi) offshore, in September 1998. The Molikpaq has production capacity of 90,000 barrels per day (14,000 m^{3}/d) of oil and 1.7 million cubic meters of associated gas.

=== Lunskoye-A platform ===
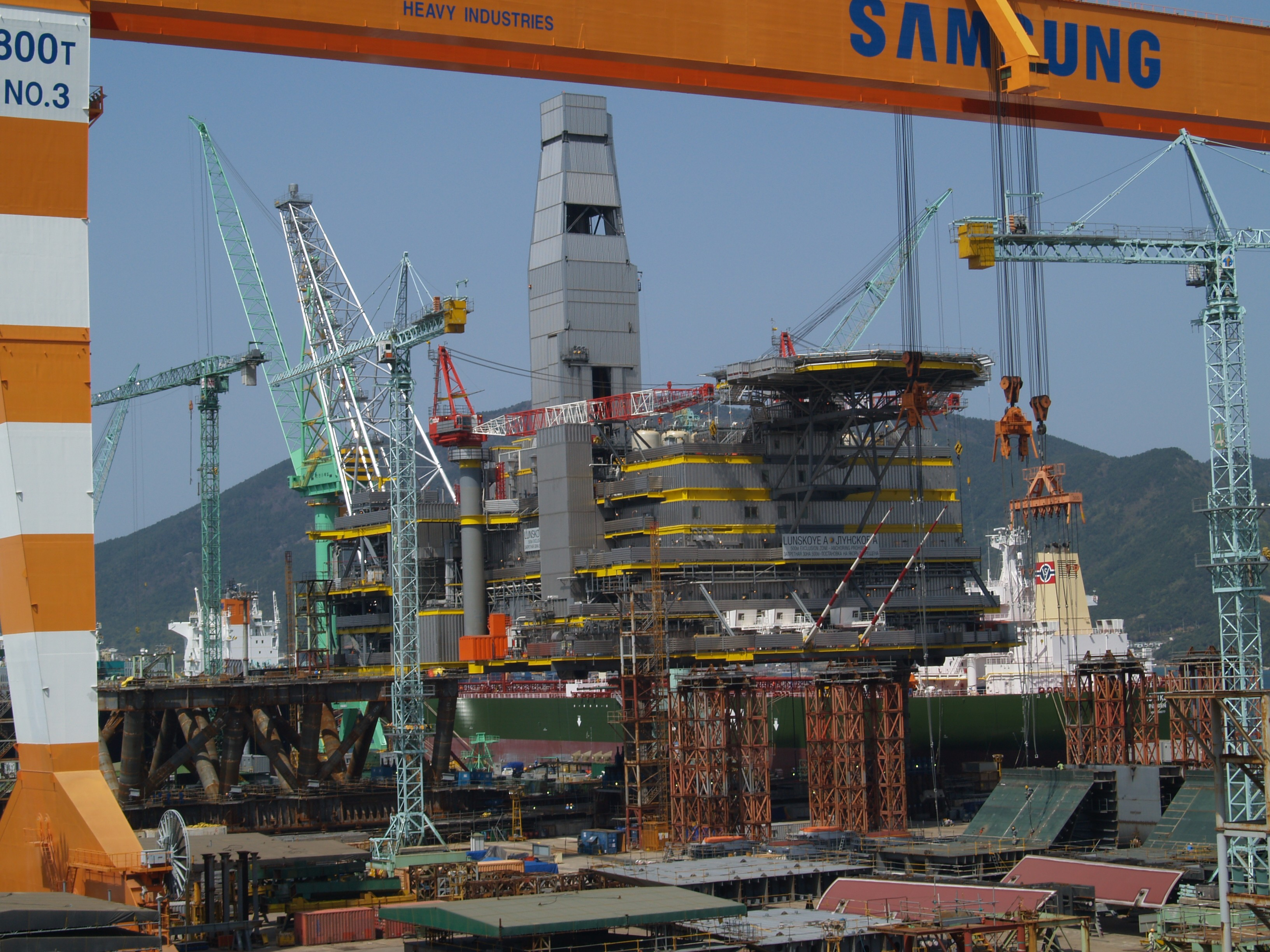
Lunskoye platform under construction

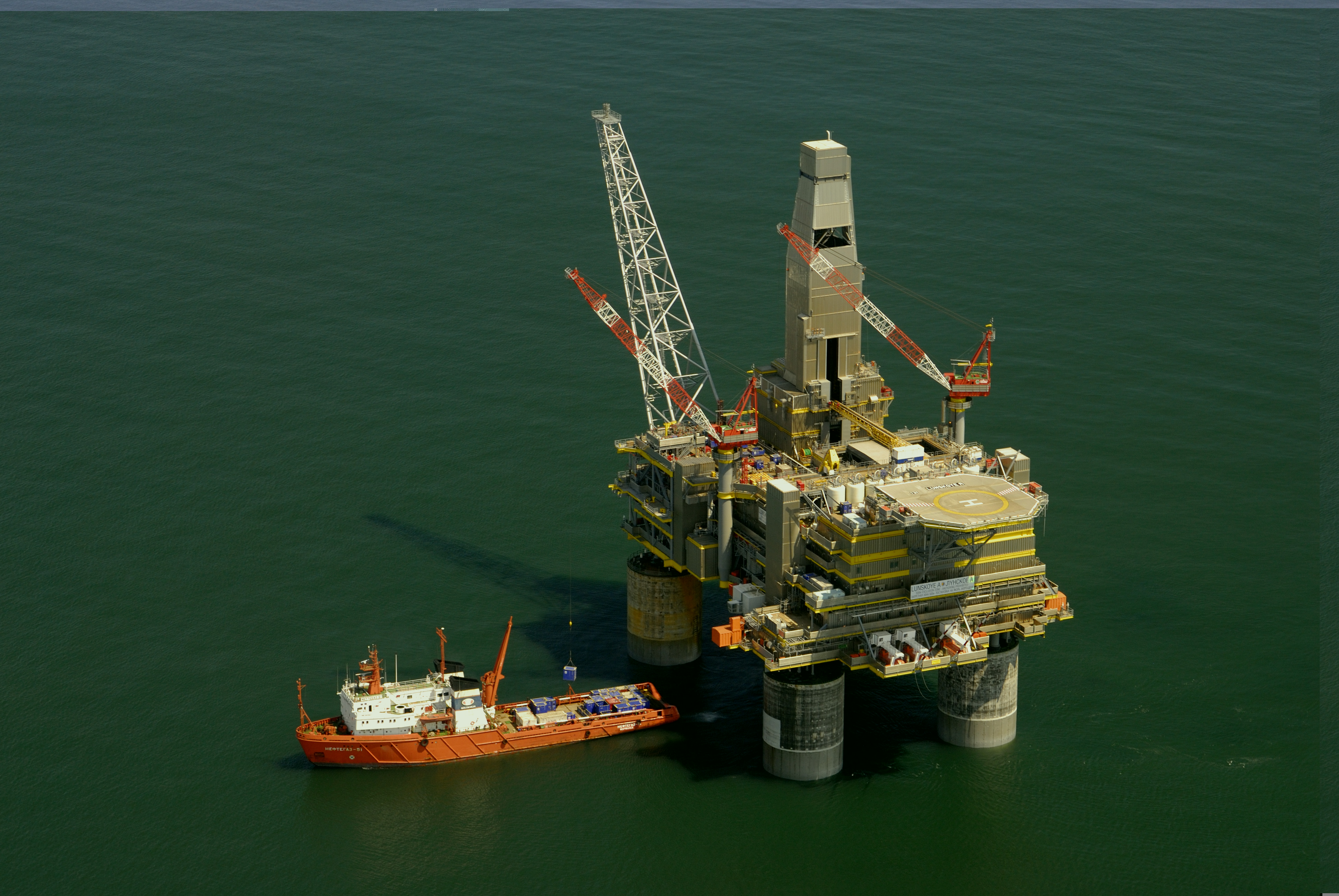
Offshore Lun-A platform

The Lunskoye field platform was installed in June 2006 at the Lunskoye gas field 15 kilometres (9.3 mi) offshore. It has production capacity over 1,800 million cu ft/d (51 million m^{3}/d) of natural gas, around 50,000 barrels per day (7,900 m^{3}/d) of peak liquids (associated water and condensate), and 16,000 barrels per day (2,500 m^{3}/d) of oil.

=== Piltun-Astokhskoye-B platform ===
The PA-B platform was installed in July 2007 in the Piltun area of the Piltun-Astokhskoye oil field, 12 kilometres (7.5 mi) offshore. The PA-B has production capacity of 70,000 barrels per day (11,000 m^{3}/d) of oil and 100 million cu ft/d (2.8 million m^{3}/d) of associated gas.

=== Onshore processing facility ===
The onshore processing facility is located in the north-east of Sakhalin Island, 7 kilometres (4.3 mi) inland in Nogliki district. It is designed to process natural gas, condensate, and oil from the Lunskoye and the Piltun-Astokhskoye fields prior to pipeline transportation to the oil export terminal and the liquefied natural gas plant in Aniva Bay in the south of Sakhalin Island.

=== TransSakhalin pipelines ===
The TransSakhalin pipeline system is designed for transportation of hydrocarbons from the Piltun-Astokhskoye and Lunskoye fields in the North of Sakhalin Island to the onshore processing facility in the Nogliki district and to the LNG plant and the oil export terminal in Aniva Bay.

=== Oil export terminal ===
The oil export terminal is located in Aniva Bay to the east of the LNG plant. It includes the export pipeline and the tanker loading unit, where oil-loading to tankers is performed.

=== LNG plant ===
The Sakhalin-2 LNG plant is the first of its kind in Russia. It is located in Prigorodnoye in Aniva Bay, 13 kilometres (8.1 mi) east of Korsakov. Construction of the LNG plant was carried out by OAO Nipigaspererabothka (Nipigas) and the KhimEnergo consortium, together with two Japanese companies Chiyoda Corporation and Toyo Engineering Corporation. The plant has been designed to prevent major loss of containment in the event of an earthquake and to ensure the structural integrity of critical elements such as emergency shut down valves and the control room of the plant.

The LNG plant includes:

- Two 100,000 cubic metres (3,500,000 cu ft) LNG storage tanks
- An LNG jetty
- Two LNG processing trains, each with capacity of 4.8 million tons of LNG per year
- Two refrigerant storage spheres, 1,600 cubic metres (57,000 cu ft) each (gross capacity) for propane and ethane storage
- A diesel fuel system
- A heat transfer fluid system for the supply of heat to various process consumers
- Five gas turbine driven generators with a total capacity of around 129 MW electrical power
- Utility systems including instrument air and nitrogen plants and diesel fuel systems
- A waste water treatment plant to treat both sewage water and coil-containing water.

The LNG plant production capacity is 9.6 million tons of LNG per year. The consortium is examining the possibility of adding another train. A special gas liquefaction process was developed by Shell for use in cold climates such as Sakhalin, based on the use of a double mixed refrigerant.

The LNG plant has two LNG double-walled, storage tanks with a capacity of 100,000 cubic metres (3,500,000 cu ft) each. LNG is exported via an 805 metres (2,641 ft) jetty in Aniva Bay. The jetty is fitted with four arms – two loading arms, one dual purpose arm and one vapour return arm. The upper deck is designed for a road bed and electric cables. The lower deck is used for the LNG pipeline, communication lines and a footpath. LNG is pumped from the storage tanks into the parallel loading lines which are brought to the LNG jetty. At the jetty head, the pipelines are connected with the jetty's four loading arms. The water depth at the tail of the jetty is 14 metres (46 ft).

== Supply contracts ==
Contracts for the supply of LNG have been signed with:

- Kyūshū Electric Power Company: 0.5 million tonnes per year – 24 years (June 2004)
- Shell Eastern Trading Ltd: 37 million tonnes over a 20-year period (October 2004)
- Tokyo Gas: 1.1 million tonnes per year – 24 years (February 2005)
- Toho Gas: 0.5 million tonnes per year – 24 years (June 2005)
- Korea Gas Corporation: 1.5 million tonnes per year – 20 years (July 2005)
- Hiroshima Gas Co. Ltd: 0.21 million tonnes per year −20 years (April 2006)
- Tōhoku Electric Power Company: 0.42 million tonnes per year – 20 years (May 2006)
- Osaka Gas: 0.20 million tonnes per annum – 20 years (February 2007)
- Chūbu Electric Power Company: 0.5 million tonnes per year – 15 years (August 2007)

== Consortium ==
The projects is owned and operated by Sakhalin Energy. Shareholders of Sakhalin Energy are:

- Gazprom Sakhalin Holdings B.V. (subsidiary of Gazprom) – 50% plus 1 share
- Mitsui Sakhalin Holdings B.V. (subsidiary of Mitsui)- 12.5%
- Diamond Gas Sakhalin (subsidiary of Mitsubishi) – 10%
- Confiscated from Shell Sakhalin Holdings B.V. (subsidiary of Royal Dutch Shell) – 27.5% minus 1 share (following the Russian invasion of Ukraine), valued at 94.8 billion roubles ($1.1 billion) by a Russian auditor.

== Financing ==
Sakhalin Energy looked for finances from the European Bank for Reconstruction and Development. However, on 11 January 2007 EBRD withdrew its consideration of financing for Sakhalin-2, claiming that Gazprom's acquisition of the controlling stake of Sakhalin-2 resulted in a to the project making it is unfeasible for the EBRD to pursue the current project. Meanwhile, environmental organizations contend that Sakhalin II had "chronically and substantially violated EBRD's environmental policy".

The consortium applied for nearly a billion dollars in financing from the public export credit agencies of the United States and the United Kingdom, but in early March 2008 these applications were withdrawn due to the drawn-out and uncertain decision-making process] by these banks. However, environmental groups contend that the drawn-out process was due to the fact that the company failed to demonstrate compliance with these public banks' environmental policies.

In June 2008 Sakhalin Energy signed Russia's largest project finance deal, securing a loan of US$5.3 billion from the Japan Bank for International Cooperation and a consortium of international banks. Japan Bank for International Cooperation provided $3.7 billion of the funds.

In October 2009 Sakhalin Energy secured an additional $1.4 billion in project financing, bringing the total Phase 2 project financing up to $6.7 billion. The additional debt was provided by a consortium of international commercial banks and insured by Nippon Export and Investment Insurance (NEXI), an Export Credit Agency owned by the Japanese government.

== Environmental impact ==
In July 2005, a Russian court upheld the appeal of environmentalists who claimed in a petition that Sakhalin Energy's environmental impact assessment, was inadequate. Sakhalin Energy denied the claims and stated them as vague and inaccurate. The environmental and social concerns came to a head at the end of November 2005 when the chief executive of WWF, Robert Napier, said that it would have a "negative impact on Sakhalin's people and environment". The WWF asserted that Sakhalin-2 threatens marine life as well as potentially damaging the local communities in the region. Sakhalin Energy responded to the WWF's assertion by saying that the project meets lenders' policies and that environmental and social issues have been met.

In September 2006, Sakhalin Energy briefly suspended construction work on its pipelines. Oleg Mitvol, the deputy chief of the Russian Federal Service for Natural Resources, had announced in early August 2006 that, according to his data, Sakhalin Energy failed to take all actions required to eliminate the danger of the mud flow. This was supported by President Vladimir Putin.

For more than 20 years of operation Sakhalin Energy exercises industrial environmental control of its assets to ensure the compliance with legislation on environmental protection, to observe established environmental regulations, and to provide the rational use of natural resources and fulfilment of the plans for minimising the environmental impact.

The company exercises industrial environmental control in the following areas: – air emissions; – water use and discharge; – waste management. The company has developed and implements the Air Emissions and Energy Management Standard, Water Use Standard and Waste Management Standard. For more details see Sustainable Development Report

=== Gray whales ===
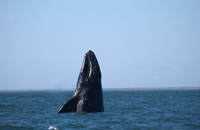
Western gray whale on Sakhalin

One key concern from environmental groups is that the Sakhalin-2 project will harm the western gray whale population. The whales summer feeding grounds are close to the project's offshore platforms in the Sea of Okhotsk.

In 2006, the International Union for Conservation of Nature set up the Western Gray Whale Advisory Panel (WGWAP). Its members are marine scientists who give independent advice to Sakhalin Energy about managing any potential risks to the western gray whales. The Russian Academy of Sciences has identified an increasing population of western gray whales in the Sea of Okhotsk during a photo identification research programme. However, in February 2009 the WGWAP issued an urgent warning that the number of western gray whales observed in the primary (near shore) feeding area had decreased and the panel called for a "...moratorium on all industrial activities, both maritime and terrestrial, that have the potential to disturb gray whales in summer and autumn on and near their main feeding areas." In a meeting in April 2009, the WGWAP reiterated its urgent plea for a moratorium. Sakhalin Energy then agreed to suspend its planned summer 2009 seismic testing.

The Far Eastern Regional Hydrometeorological Research Institute is involved in regular monitoring of the western gray whales near the oil and gas developments on the Sakhalin Shelf.

In December 2008, Sakhalin Energy won the Environmental Project of the Year award. The company's protection of the western gray whale population was recognised in the Environmental Efficiency of Economics category. The award was presented by Yuri Trutnev, the Russian Federation's Natural Resources Minister.

Seismic surveys carried out separately by Rosneft, Sakhalin Energy and Gazprom occurred during 2010. Critically endangered North Pacific right whales are also present in the region.

Sakhalin Energy in cooperation with Sakhalin-1 operator implements the integrated monitoring programme near the north-eastern coast of Sakhalin Island. It shows that the distribution of whales in feeding areas did not vary significantly during the whole period of the study; the number of individuals in the aggregation is increasing, and its reproduction rate is stable. A study was conducted to research the composition, distribution and variability of the communities of gray whale food organisms.

=== Salmon fishing ===
Other concerns are that the project will threaten the livelihood of tens of thousands of fishermen, destroy the key salmon fishing area off the island by dumping one million tons of dredging spoil waste into the sea, and imply a long-time threat of a large oil spill in the Sea of Okhotsk and Sea of Japan. Dredging of Aniva Bay was completed in 2005. In 2005 the salmon harvest was recorded as an all-time high of more than 134,000 tonnes. In 2007 this record was overturned with a salmon catch of 144,181 tonnes.

Sakhalin Energy paid compensation of $110,000 to the Russian Federation to cover potential fish impacts from the Sakhalin-2 project. This compensation was paid regardless of whether any impact was recorded on the fishing industry or not. Part of these funds was used to set up thriving salmon hatcheries on Sakhalin Island.

In 2007, the company started a programme to identify the taimen (a rare protected species of salmon) habitats in the river systems along the pipeline to ensure that production activity will not put the existence of this species at risk.

At the first stage, the distribution and the number of young taimen in several rivers were studied. In 2011, a new phase was launched under the programme, based on the basin-oriented approach to the study of ichthyofauna, including the Sakhalin taimen.

In 2017, ichthyological studies were carried out in the Val River basin. In the course of the work, 29 stations were completed in the main channel, eight — in the tributaries of the river, and two — in the adjoining lakes. In total, 19 species of fish from nine families were identified in the Val River, watercourses and reservoirs in its basin. The family of salmonids was represented by the largest number of species: all four species of the Pacific salmon (genus Oncorhynchus) reproducing in the rivers of Sakhalin, three species of the Arctic salmon of the genus Salvelinus, and the Sakhalin taimen. The family of cyprinids was represented by four species; the remaining families were represented by one species each.

=== Impacts on rivers and streams ===
According to the Sakhalin Environment Watch, the following environmental changes have occurred:

- Pilenga River: Erosion control is visible on one bank but not on the other bank as of April 2006.
- Mereya River: Active slope erosion and water pollution as of July 2005.
- Woskresenkovka River: The clear river is threatened by the creation of a junction of two pipeline trenches filled with mud as of December 2005.
- Golubichnaya River: Normally this river would not be frozen solid in winter but the digging of the trench has provoked the complete lack of river flow as of December 2005.
- Bystraya River: The river ice is covered by soil as a result of the river crossing, which will result in additional contamination when the ice melts as of December 2005.
- Stolichnyi stream: Ploughed-up channel of spawning stream and active erosion and silted processes as of August 2005.

Nevertheless, these concerns were doubted. While preparing for work execution and during the construction, Sakhalin Energy conducted baseline studies and operational monitoring of all crossing areas of water bodies. For the operations phase, a comprehensive observation programme was developed to monitor the most environmentally significant and hydrographically complex water bodies, which allows the company to monitor any changes, to identify critical areas, to develop and take timely corrective measures.

In 2017, the monitoring of hydrological and hydrochemical characteristics and condition of bottom sediments was implemented at 24 water bodies crossed by the pipelines, as well as in the area of potential impact from OPF at the Vatung River, and in the area of the Prigorodnoye production complex at the Mereya River and the Goluboy Brook. In the course of work under the special programme, at the request of oversight bodies, a study was conducted of the Nabil River (with a nameless tributary) and the Nayba River, whose under-river crossings were performed using the horizontal directional drilling (HDD) method.

Monitoring was performed during three hydrological seasons: spring floods, summer low water and autumn high water. Sampling was carried out at two cross sections — the upstream baseline (with no impact from the company's infrastructure assets) and downstream monitoring sections. On most investigated river-crossing sites (from the upstream to the downstream cross sections) no significant horizontal or vertical deformations of river beds were found. The crossings are in satisfactory condition, and no damage to utility lines was found.

In 2017 the River Ecosystems Monitoring did not reveal surface water contamination with oil products. All measurement values were insignificant and in line with MAC standards.

== See also ==
- Sakhalin–Khabarovsk–Vladivostok pipeline
- Energy policy of Russia
- Sakhalin-I
- Liquefied natural gas industry in Russia
- Petroleum industry in Russia
