= Sakhalin Energy =

Russian oil and gas company

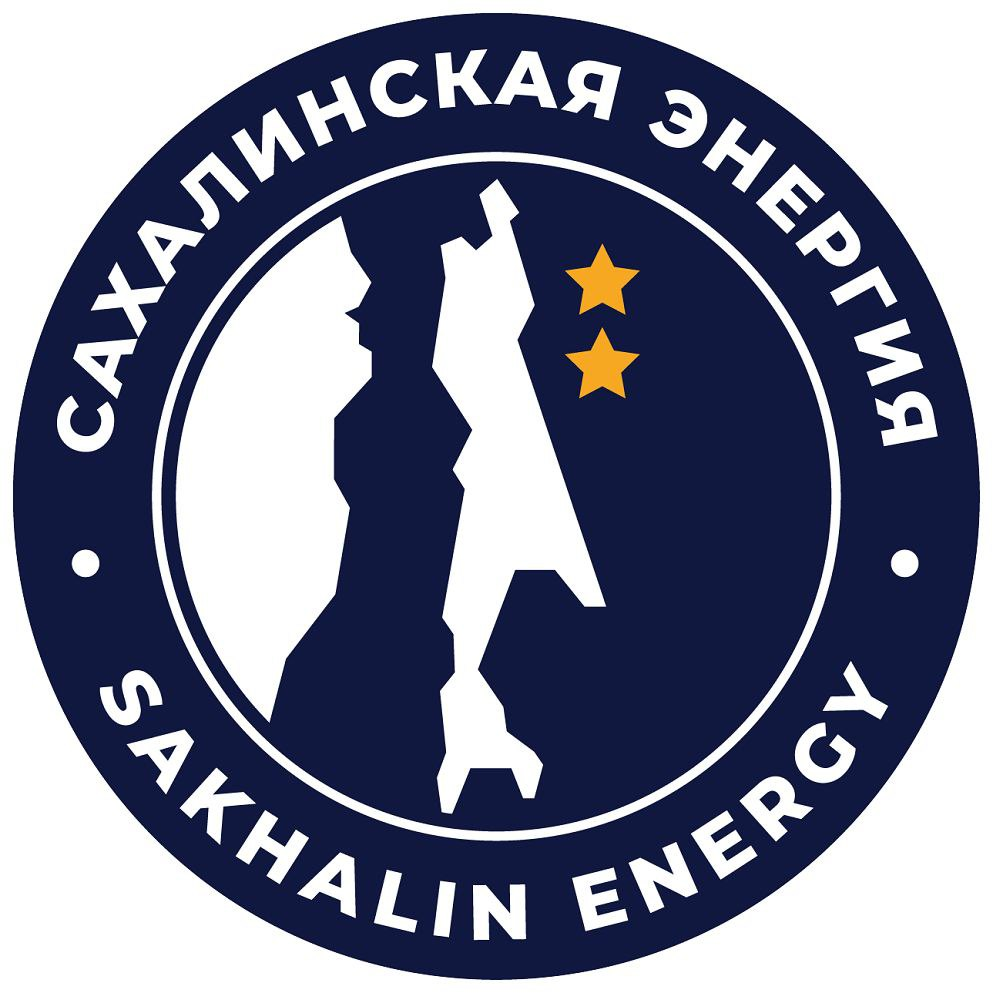
- Type: Private
- Industry: Petroleum
- Founded: 1994; 32 years ago
- Headquarters: Yuzhno-Sakhalinsk, Russia
- Key people: Roman Dashkov (CEO)
- Revenue: $5.4 billion (2017)
- Net income: $86 million (2016)
- Total assets: $15 billion (2016)
- Total equity: $5.52 billion (2016)
- Number of employees: 2,230 (2190 (2020))
- Parent: Gazprom; Mitsubishi; Mitsui
- Website: https://www.sakhalinenergy.ru/en/

Sakhalin Energy Investment Company Ltd. (Sakhalin Energy) is a consortium for developing the Sakhalin-2 oil and gas project with corporate head office in Yuzhno-Sakhalinsk. Roman Dashkov has been the Chief Executive Officer since 2013.

The company's principal activities are the production and export of crude oil (since 1999) and liquefied natural gas (from 2009).

== History ==
The original consortium was formed in 1991 by Marathon, McDermott, Mitsui and Russian Federation as MMM Consortium. Shell and Mitsubishi joined the consortium in 1992, to make it MMMMS. In April 1994, the consortium formed Sakhalin Energy Investment Company Ltd. incorporated in Bermuda to develop and manage the Sakhalin II project. Sakhalin Energy signed a production sharing agreement with the Russian Federation in 2004.

McDermott sold its share to the other partners in 1997 and Marathon traded its share to Shell for other properties (the BP operated Foinaven field, near the Shetland Islands, and an eight block area in the Gulf of Mexico—including the Ursa field) in 2000.

In 2007, Shell was forced by the Russian government to sell part of its stake to Gazprom which made Gazprom the largest shareholder with 50% share of the company. The consortium then developed into its current form, consisting of Russia's Gazprom, Royal Dutch Shell, and Japan's Mitsui and Mitsubishi.

In November 2009, Sakhalin Energy joined the United Nations Global Compact.

After the Russian invasion of Ukraine in February 2022, Shell said that it would exit Sakhalin-2 and other ventures in Russia. On 30 June 2022, Russian President Vladimir Putin signed a decree ordering the transfer of the Sakhalin-2 project to a new domestic operator. Foreign investors will be required to apply to retain their existing shares in the new Russian company within a month. The Russian government will then decide whether to allow foreign shareholders to keep their stake. If they are rejected, the government will sell the foreign shareholder’s stake and keep the proceeds in the shareholder’s special account.

== Operations ==
Sakhalin Energy develops the Piltun-Astokhskoye and the Lunskoye oil and gas fields, known as the Sakhalin-II project, in the Sea of Okhotsk, offshore Sakhalin island in the Russian Far East. The infrastructure of the Sakhalin-II project includes:

- Offshore Molikpaq platform
- Offshore Piltun-Astokhskoye-B platform
- Offshore Lunskoye-A platform
- Onshore processing facility
- Transsakhalin pipeline system
- LNG plant and oil export terminal within Prigorodnoye Production Complex

About 4% of global supply of LNG comes from the Prigorodnoye production complex. PA-B won the overall Drilling Rig of the year award with Molikpaq in the runner’s up and LUN-A in the 5th place in the Shell Rig League table in 2017, which ranks on the performance, HSE and People scores.

Following the OPEC+ deal, agreed in April 2020 amid falling global demand in oil, the Sakhalin-II project reduced its oil output from 108,000 to 88,000 bpd, a decline in production of 18.3%.

In June 2020, Sakhalin Energy's oil and has production licences were extended for five years, after being awarded in 1996 and due to expire in 2021. The firm now holds exploratory and production rights until May 2026.

In 2020, according to the International Financial Reporting Standards (IFRS), revenues of Sakhalin Energy amounted to US$ 4,383 mln, and its total net income was US$ 1,080 mln.

In 2022, the company's revenue amounted to 320 billion rubles.

== Shareholders ==
The current shareholders are:

- Gazprom Sakhalin Holdings B.V. (subsidiary of Gazprom) - 50% plus 1 share
- Royal Dutch Shell Sakhalin Holdings B.V. (subsidiary of Royal Dutch Shell) - 27.5% minus 1 share (intends to sell all shares due to Russian invasion of Ukraine)
- Mitsui Sakhalin Holdings B.V. (subsidiary of Mitsui) - 12.5%
- Mitsubishi - 10%

== See also ==
- Petroleum industry in Russia
