= Project MPSV07 salvage ship =

Russian salvage ship family

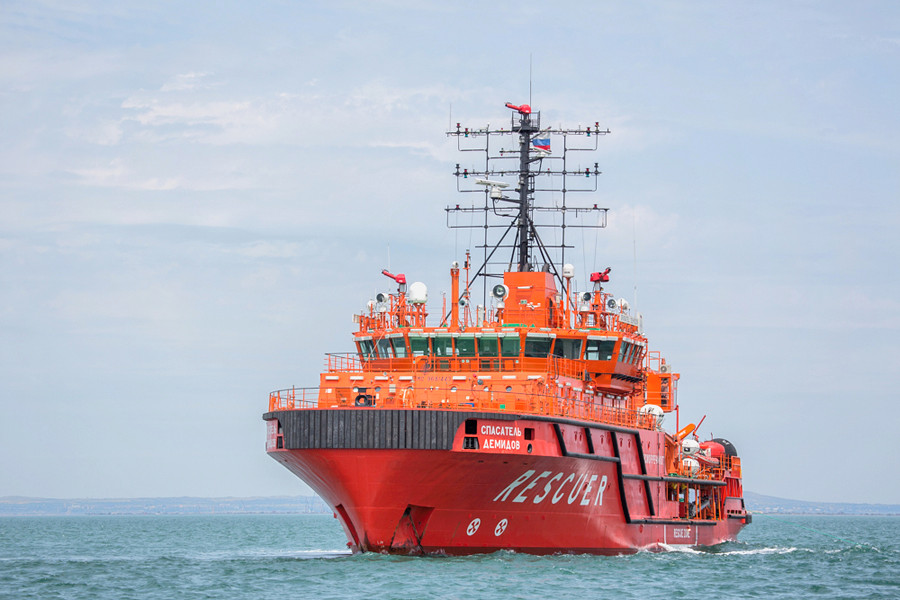

Class overview
- Builders: Nevsky Shipyard (Shlisselburg, Russia); Zalyv Shipbuilding Yard (Kerch, Zelenodolsk Shipyard (Zelenodolsk, Russia)
- Operators: (Russia) Rosmorrechflot Marine Rescue Service
- Built: 2009–present
- In service: 2012–present
- Planned: 6
- Building: 1
- Completed: 5

General characteristics (for Spasatel Karev)
- Type: Salvage ship
- Tonnage: 2,530 GT; 759 NT; 1,215 DWT
- Displacement: 2,525 t (2,485 long tons)
- Length: 73 m (240 ft)
- Beam: 16.6 m (54 ft)
- Draught: 5.1 m (17 ft)
- Ice class: RS Arc5
- Installed power: 4 × Wärtsilä 8L20C (4 × 1,440 kW)
- Propulsion: Diesel-electric; two Steerprop SP45D/L3600 azimuth thrusters (2 × 2,060 kW); Two bow thrusters (2 × 995 kW)
- Speed: 15 knots (28 km/h; 17 mph)
- Endurance: 20 days
- Capacity: 94 m^{3} of cargo; 668 m^{3} of recovered oil; 69 survivors
- Crew: 20 crew; 12 supernumeraries

Project MPSV07 salvage ships are a series of Russian ice-strengthened multipurpose salvage ships.

== Design ==
The vessels are 73 m long, and deadweight at maximum draft is approximately 1,171 t. The vessels has a sea endurance of 20 days. The vessels are equipped with machinery to investigate the sea bed and damaged objects lying in depths of up to 1,000 m. MPSV07 class can also support underwater diving operations to depths as great as 300 m.

== Career ==
The Spasatel Demidov was called upon to control a fire aboard two LNG carriers, in the Sea of Azov, on January 21, 2019. Despite throwing water on both the ships, fire continued for three to five days or more.

In November 2023, Spasatel Karev repaired the Baltika telecommunications cable that had been damaged at the same time as damage occurred to the Balticconnector natural gas pipeline in the Gulf of Finland.

On 10 September 2025, HUR (Ukrainian military intelligence) claimed to have struck the bridge of a Project MPSV07 salvage ship in Novorossiysk Bay near Krasnodar Krai. HUR claimed that the ship was disabled and sent back for “costly repairs”, the name of the vessel is unknown.

== Ships in class ==
Name	Builder	Yard number	IMO number	Keel laid	Launched	Delivered	Port of registry	Status	Image	Ref
Spasatel Karev	Nevsky Shipyard	701	9497531	22 September 2009	23 November 2010	16 November 2012	Saint Petersburg	In service		
Spasatel Kavdejkin	Nevsky Shipyard	702	9593933	6 April 2010	29 September 2011	6 August 2013	Korsakov	In service		
Spasatel Zaborshchikov	Nevsky Shipyard	703	9593945	17 May 2010	22 June 2012	20 June 2014	Vladivostok	In service		
Spasatel Demidov	Nevsky Shipyard	704	9681443	25 April 2013	12 August 2014	4 December 2015	Novorossiysk	In Service		
Spasatel Ilyin	Zalyv Shipbuilding Yard	01500	9830549	9 September 2016	21 February 2019	15 May 2023	Novorossiysk	In service		
Spasatel Gruzinskiy	Zelenodolsk Shipyard	447	9990612	13 November 2021		2024 (planned)	Saint Petersburg	Under construction		
