= Lesogorsk (work settlement), Nizhny Novgorod Oblast =

Lesogorsk Лесогорск
- Urban-type settlement
- Interactive map of Lesogorsk
- Location of Lesogorsk Lesogorsk (Nizhny Novgorod Oblast)
- Coordinates: 55.1037°N 43.9471°E
- Country: Russia
- Federal subject: Nizhny Novgorod Oblast
- Administrative district: Shatkovsky District

Population (2010 Census)
  - Total: 1,015
  - Estimate (2021): 904 (−10.9%)
- Time zone: UTC+3 (MSK)
- Postal code: 607710
- OKTMO ID: 22657154051

Lesogorsk (Russian: Лесого́рск) is an urban locality (an urban-type settlement) in Shatkovsky District of Nizhny Novgorod Oblast, Russia. Population: 1,015 (2010 census); 1,079 (2002 census); 1,090 (1989 Soviet census).
