= Korsakov (air base) =

Former Soviet naval airfield

- IATA: none; ICAO: none

Summary
- Airport type: Abandoned
- Operator: Soviet Naval Aviation
- Location: Korsakov
- Elevation AMSL: 367 ft / 112 m
- Coordinates: 46°42′33″N 142°52′10″E
- Interactive map of Korsakov

Runways
Direction	Length		Surface
Direction	ft	m	Surface
03/21	9,842	3,000	Concrete

Korsakov (also Novaya (US)) was a Soviet Naval Aviation reserve airfield on Sakhalin, Russia located 11 km (7 mi) northeast of Korsakov. It was first listed by US intelligence in 1964, when significant construction of the runway was underway. Due to the long runway length it was likely intended for dispersal of Tupolev Tu-16R medium reconnaissance jets, and may have been built to meet Defense Minister Rodion Malinovsky's directive that every American aircraft carrier between Midway Island and the Kuril Ridge be photographed by Soviet Tupolev Tu-16R reconnaissance aircraft.

The airfield appears to have been abandoned after the Cold War, and satellite imagery shows much of the concrete has been reclaimed.

== Korsakova airfield ==
A smaller airfield given variously as Korsakovka or Korsakova is located 3 km southeast of the town. As with Korsakov it was also a Soviet Naval Aviation base. It had a much shorter runway, measuring only 1500 m. Up to 12 light helicopters were observed in 1967. Due to the similar name with the larger airfield the two are often confused with one another on historical intelligence documents, requiring careful attention.
