= Aniva =

Town in Sakhalin Oblast, Russia

Aniva Анива
- Town
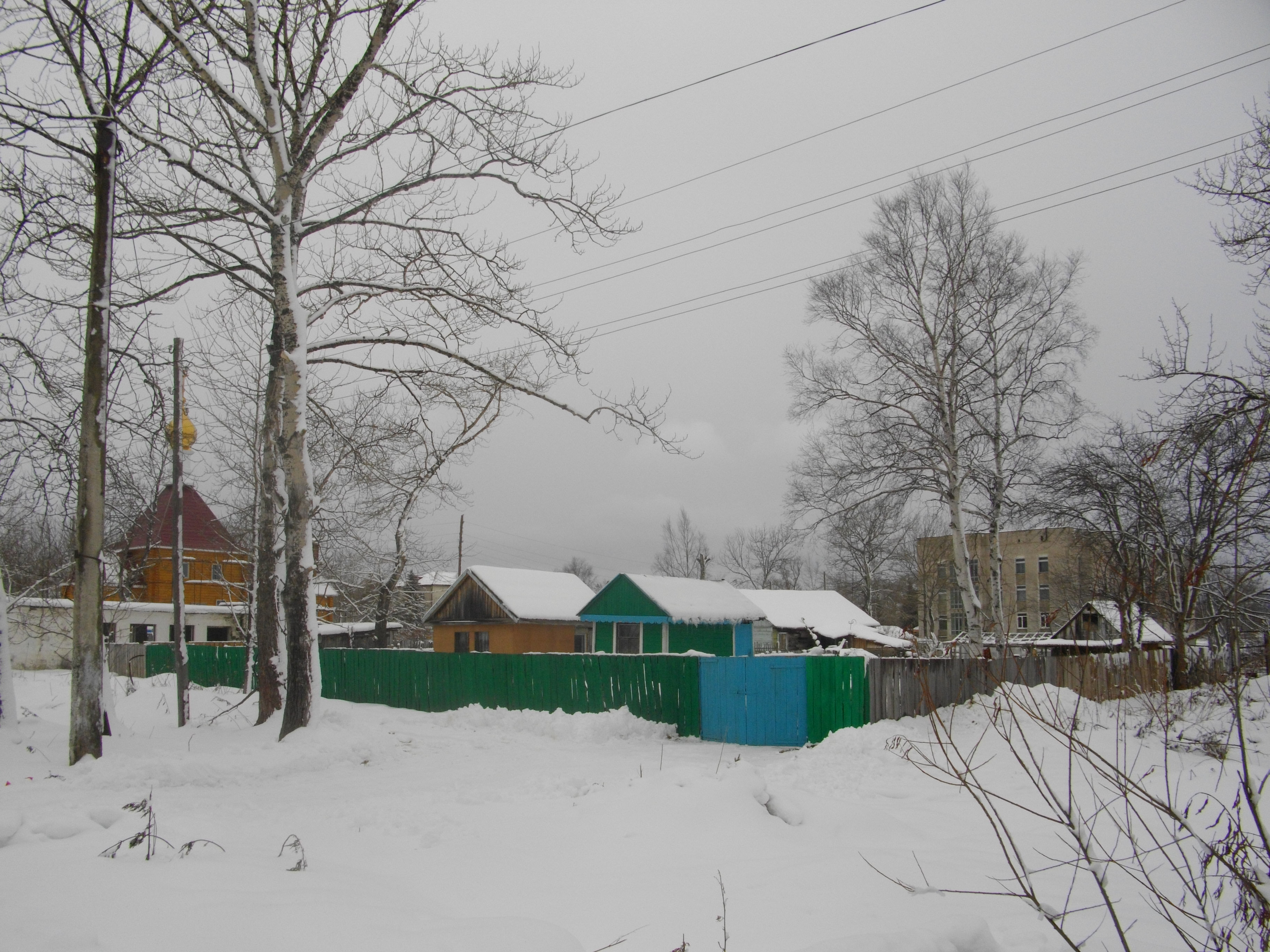
- A typical view of Aniva

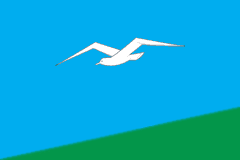
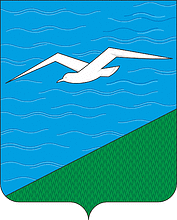
- Flag Coat of arms
- Interactive map of Aniva
- Location of Aniva Aniva (Sakhalin Oblast)
- Coordinates: 46°43′N 142°31′E
- Country: Russia
- Federal subject: Sakhalin Oblast
- Administrative district: Anivsky District
- Founded: 1886
- Town status since: 1946

Government
  - Head: Nikolay Petrov
- Elevation: 3 m (9.8 ft)

Population (2010 Census)
  - Total: 9,115
  - Estimate (1 January 2024): 9,686 (+6.3%)

Administrative status
  - Capital of: Anivsky District

Municipal status
  - Urban okrug: Anivsky Urban Okrug
  - Capital of: Anivsky Urban Okrug
- Time zone: UTC+11 (MSK+8)
- Postal code: 694030
- Dialing code: +7 42441
- OKTMO ID: 64708000001
- Website: web.archive.org/web/20091017154429/http://www.aniva.marketcenter.ru/

Aniva (Russian: Ани́ва) is a coastal town and the administrative center of Anivsky District of Sakhalin Oblast, Russia, located on the coast of Aniva Bay in southern Sakhalin Island on the Lyutoga River, 37 kilometers (23 mi) south of Yuzhno-Sakhalinsk. Population: 9,115 (2010 census); 8,084 (2002 census); 8,905 (1989 Soviet census).

== History ==
It was founded in 1886 as the village of Lyutoga (Лютога). In 1905, it was ceded to Japan with the rest of the southern part of Sakhalin by the Treaty of Portsmouth and renamed Rutaka (留多加町, Rutaka-chō) by the Japanese. The village was recaptured by the Soviet Union in 1945; it was granted town status and renamed Aniva in 1946.

The origin of the name of the bay is most likely associated with the Ainu words “en” and “willow”. The first is usually translated as “existing, located”, and the second as “mountain range, rock, peak”; thus, “Aniva” can be translated as “having ridges” or “located among the ridges (mountains)”

== Administrative and municipal status ==
Within the framework of administrative divisions, Aniva serves as the administrative center of Anivsky District and is subordinated to it. As a municipal division, the town of Aniva and fifteen rural localities of Anivsky District are incorporated as Anivsky Urban Okrug.

== Economy ==
The town's economy relies mainly on fishing, particularly salmon.

== Sister city ==
Higashikawa (since 2018).
