= Prigorodnoye (seaport) =

Seaport in Sakhalin Oblast, Russia

Coordinates: 46°37′39.00″N 142°54′10.08″E

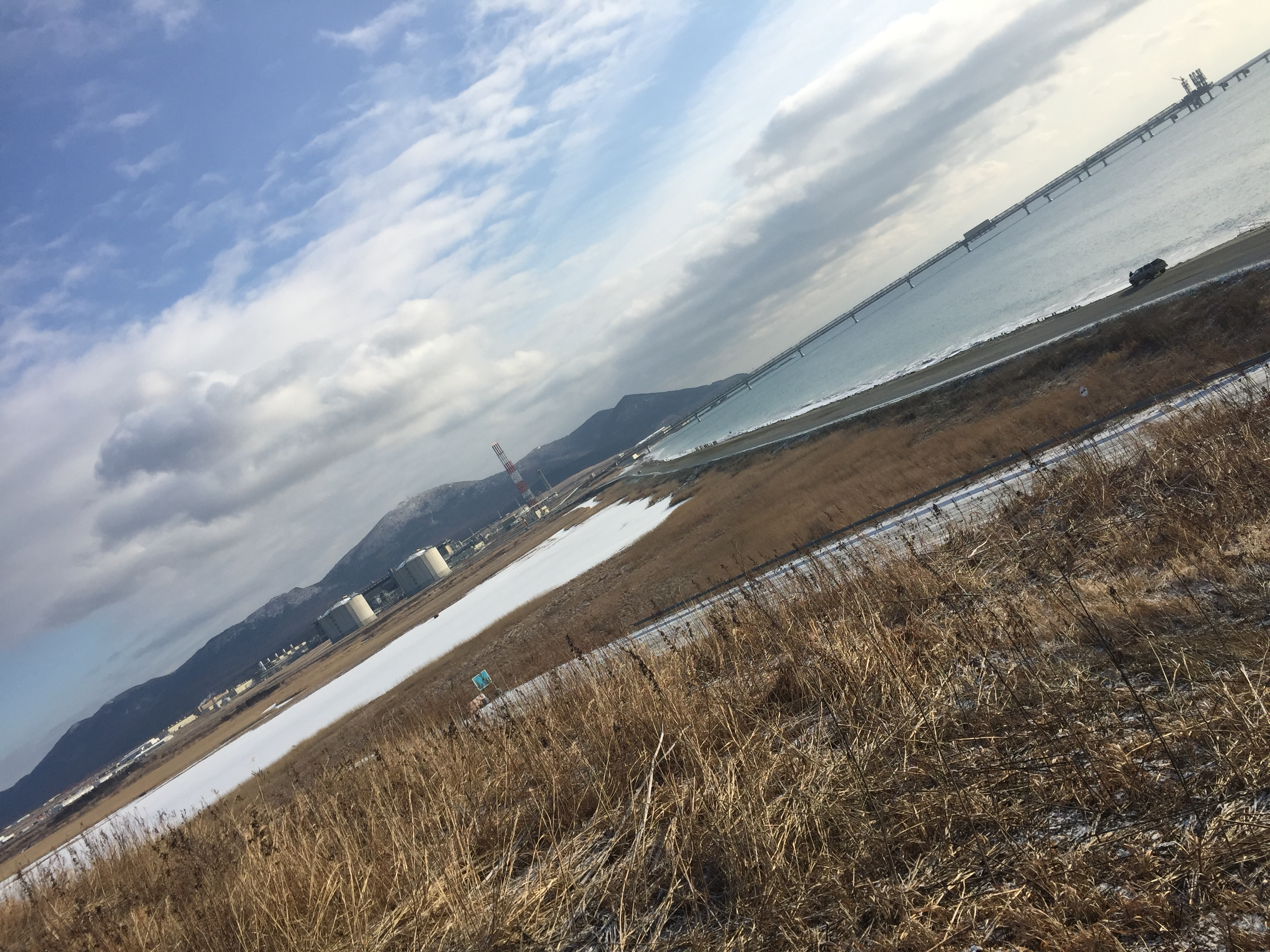
Image of Port Prigorodnoye

Prigorodnoye (Russian: При́городное) is a specialized seaport in the Korsakovsky District of Sakhalin Oblast, on the Pacific coast in the Russian Far East. It is located on the Mereya River, not far from the district's administrative center of Korsakov.

== History ==
It was known as Fukami (深海村, Fukami-mura) when it was part of Japan from 1905 to 1945.

The port is now the site of the large liquefied natural gas plant constructed under the auspices of the Sakhalin-II project.
