= Uglegorsk, Sakhalin Oblast =

Town in Sakhalin Oblast, Russia

Uglegorsk Углегорск
- Town
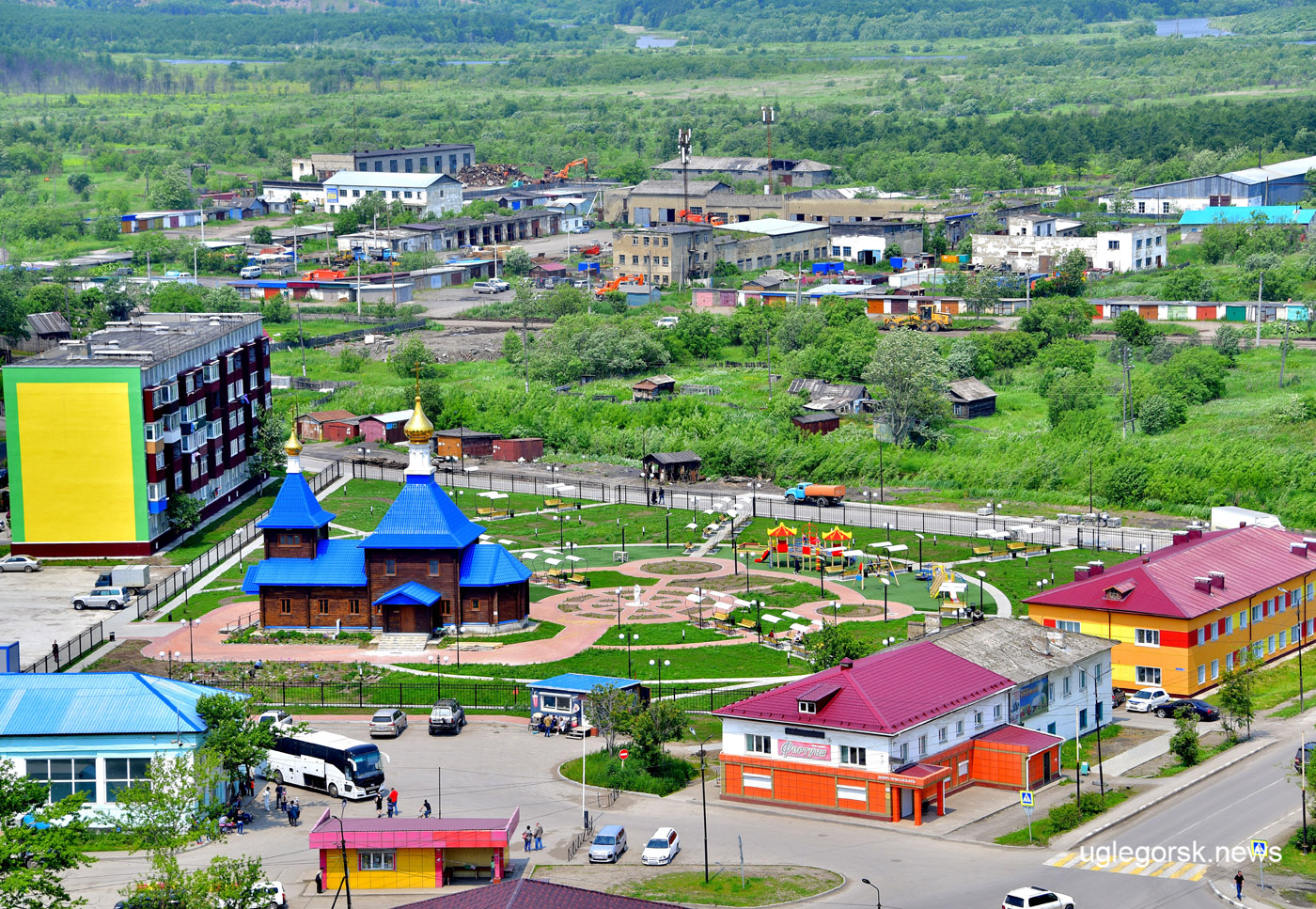

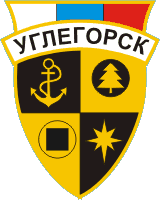
- Coat of arms
- Interactive map of Uglegorsk
- Location of Uglegorsk Uglegorsk (Sakhalin Oblast)
- Coordinates: 49°04′N 142°02′E
- Country: Russia
- Federal subject: Sakhalin Oblast
- Administrative district: Uglegorsky District
- Town of district significanceSelsoviet: Uglegorsk
- Founded: 1905
- Town status since: 1946
- Elevation: 15 m (49 ft)

Population (2010 Census)
  - Total: 10,381
  - Estimate (2023): 7,686 (−26%)

Administrative status
  - Capital of: Uglegorsky District, town of district significance of Uglegorsk

Municipal status
  - Municipal district: Uglegorsky Municipal District
  - Urban settlement: Uglegorskoye Urban Settlement
  - Capital of: Uglegorsky Municipal District, Uglegorskoye Urban Settlement
- Time zone: UTC+11 (MSK+8)
- Postal codes: 694920, 694923, 694929
- Dialing code: +7 42432
- OKTMO ID: 64752000001

Uglegorsk (Russian: Углего́рск) is a coastal port town and the administrative center of Uglegorsky District in Sakhalin Oblast, Russia, located on the west coast of Sakhalin Island, 277 kilometers (172 mi) northwest of Yuzhno-Sakhalinsk, the administrative center of the oblast. Population: 10,381 (2010 census); 13,396 (2002 census); 18,402 (1989 Soviet census).

== History ==
It was founded as Esutoru (恵須取), meaning "between capes" in the Ainu language, during Japanese rule in 1905. It came to Soviet control along with the rest of the Sakhalin Island with the defeat of Japan in World War II. For a time, Uglegorsk was put under consideration for potential sites for the new capital of Sakhalin Oblast.

Town status was granted to it in 1946, along with its present name. The name Uglegorsk means 'coal mountain'.

== Administrative and municipal status ==
Within the framework of administrative divisions, Uglegorsk serves as the administrative center of Uglegorsky District. As an administrative division, it is incorporated within Uglegorsky District as the town of district significance of Uglegorsk. As a municipal division, the town of district significance of Uglegorsk, together with nine rural localities in Uglegorsky District, is incorporated within Uglegorsky Municipal District as Uglegorskoye Urban Settlement.

== Economy ==
Bituminous coal is mined in the surrounding area, giving the town its name. Uglegorsk is also the center of an agricultural area, mainly growing potatoes and other vegetables. Paper and timber products are also produced in the town.

== Climate ==
Uglegorsk has a humid continental climate (Köppen Dfb). The weather on the western side of Sakhalin tends to be drier and more settled than on the eastern side, since the winds from the combined force of the Siberian High and Aleutian Low run almost parallel to the coast with very little travel over water. Moreover, the winds from the summer low tend to lose some of their moisture over the island's mountains.

Climate data for Uglegorsk (1991–2020, extremes 1939–present)
Month	Jan	Feb	Mar	Apr	May	Jun	Jul	Aug	Sep	Oct	Nov	Dec	Year
Record high °C (°F)	2.6 (36.7)	5.3 (41.5)	10.9 (51.6)	21.1 (70.0)	25.1 (77.2)	27.4 (81.3)	28.8 (83.8)	29.6 (85.3)	26.6 (79.9)	21.2 (70.2)	13.8 (56.8)	7.9 (46.2)	29.6 (85.3)
Mean daily maximum °C (°F)	−8.3 (17.1)	−7.2 (19.0)	−1.9 (28.6)	4.5 (40.1)	10.3 (50.5)	14.5 (58.1)	18.5 (65.3)	20.2 (68.4)	17.2 (63.0)	10.2 (50.4)	1.0 (33.8)	−6.0 (21.2)	6.1 (43.0)
Daily mean °C (°F)	−11.0 (12.2)	−10.3 (13.5)	−4.9 (23.2)	1.2 (34.2)	6.5 (43.7)	11.2 (52.2)	15.6 (60.1)	17.3 (63.1)	13.9 (57.0)	6.9 (44.4)	−1.9 (28.6)	−8.6 (16.5)	3.0 (37.4)
Mean daily minimum °C (°F)	−13.3 (8.1)	−12.9 (8.8)	−7.6 (18.3)	−1.3 (29.7)	3.8 (38.8)	8.7 (47.7)	13.3 (55.9)	14.9 (58.8)	11.0 (51.8)	4.2 (39.6)	−4.2 (24.4)	−10.8 (12.6)	0.5 (32.9)
Record low °C (°F)	−33.4 (−28.1)	−30.1 (−22.2)	−26.3 (−15.3)	−15.7 (3.7)	−7.6 (18.3)	−2.0 (28.4)	2.2 (36.0)	4.2 (39.6)	−1.2 (29.8)	−15.9 (3.4)	−23.3 (−9.9)	−36.5 (−33.7)	−36.5 (−33.7)
Average precipitation mm (inches)	44 (1.7)	26 (1.0)	33 (1.3)	39 (1.5)	51 (2.0)	49 (1.9)	63 (2.5)	81 (3.2)	96 (3.8)	81 (3.2)	56 (2.2)	57 (2.2)	676 (26.5)
Source: pogoda.ru.net

== Tourism ==
The former Japanese shrine is available to visit.
