= Project MPSV06 salvage ship =

Russian multipurpose salvage ship

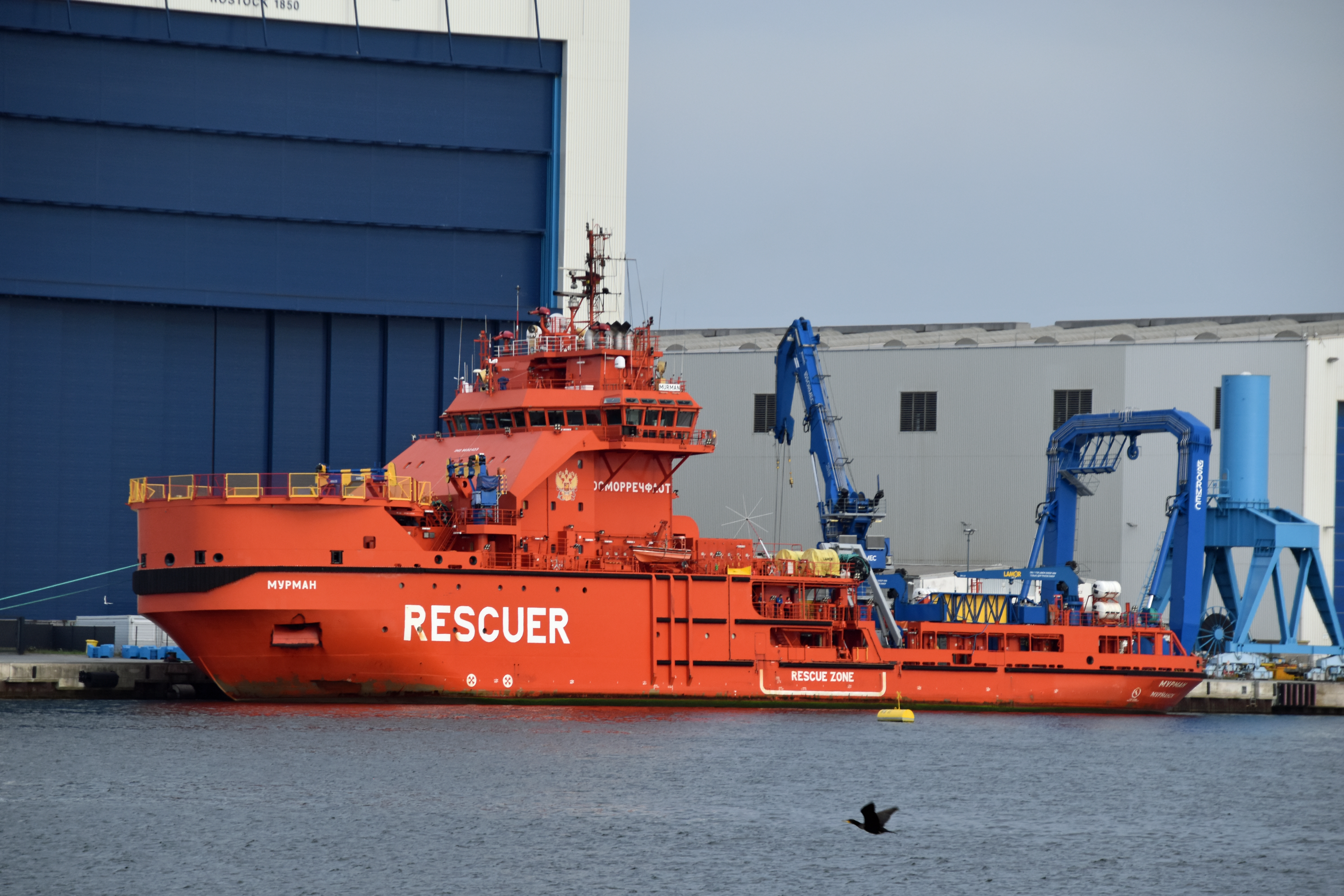
- Murman in Rostock in 2021

Class overview
- Builders: Amur Shipbuilding Plant (Komsomolsk-on-Amur, Russia); Nordic Yards Wismar (Wismar, Germany); Yantar Shipyard (Kaliningrad, Russia)
- Operators: (Russia) Rosmorrechflot Marine Rescue Service
- Built: 2010–present
- In service: 2015–present
- Planned: 5
- Building: 2
- Completed: 3

General characteristics
- Type: Icebreaker, salvage ship
- Displacement: 5,000–6,000 t (4,900–5,900 long tons)
- Length: 85–87 m (279–285 ft)
- Beam: 18–19 m (59–62 ft)
- Draft: 6–6.5 m (20–21 ft)
- Ice class: RS Icebreaker6
- Installed power: Four diesel generators
- Propulsion: Diesel-electric; two azimuth thrusters (2 × 3,500 kW); Bow thrusters
- Speed: 15 knots (28 km/h; 17 mph)
- Capacity: 800 m^{3} of cargo; 12 × 40-foot ISO containers (FEU); 95 survivors
- Crew: 26 crew; 12 supernumeraries
- Aviation facilities: Helideck for Kamov Ka-32

Project MPSV06 refers to a series of Russian icebreaking multipurpose salvage ships.

One vessel based on the original Project MPSV06 design, Kerchenskiy Proliv, was laid down at Amur Shipbuilding Plant in Russia in 2010 and entered service in 2025. Two vessels based on a slightly modified Project MPSV06-NY design, Beringov Proliv and Murman, were built at Nordic Yards Wismar in Germany in 2015. Two further vessels based on a modernized Project MPSV06M design, Pevek and Anadyr, are under construction at Yantar Shipyard in Kaliningrad with delivery scheduled for 2024.

== Development and construction ==
=== MPSV06 and MPSV06-NY ===
The federal programs Modernization of the transport system of Russia (2002–2010) and Development of the transport system of Russia (2010–2015) included the recapitalization of the Russian maritime emergency rescue fleet, much of which dated back to the Soviet times and was approaching the end of its service life, with 17 new vessels of various types. 6.67 billion rubles of federal funding were allocated for the construction of four 7-megawatt icebreaking multipurpose rescue vessels. The technical project referred to as MPSV06 was developed by Marine Engineering Bureau.

The construction of the first Project MPSV06 vessel was awarded to the Russian shipyard Amur Shipbuilding Plant in December 2009 and the keel of the vessel, tentatively named Spasatel Petr Gruzinskiy, was laid on 21 July 2010. However, construction of the 3.6 billion ruble icebreaker was later suspended due to serious deficiencies in the design documentation. The construction was later resumed and in March 2019 the technical readiness of the vessel was about 40%. By February 2020, Amur Shipbuilding Plant was reportedly "ahead of schedule" and the vessel, renamed Kerchenskiy Proliv, was launched on 30 October 2020. On 29 September 2024, the vessel left Komsomolsk-on-Amur under tow with pontoons attached to its hull to reduce draught during the voyage along the Amur River. Kerchenskiy Proliv was towed to Vladivostok for final outfitting and sea trials, and was delivered to the customer on 28 December 2025.

On 19 December 2012, the German shipbuilder Nordic Yards based in Wismar was awarded a 150 million euro contract for the construction of the two further Project MPSV06 icebreaking multipurpose salvage ships. Due to modifications to the original design, the German-built vessels are referred to as separate subclass, MPSV06-NY. The vessels were launched together on 21 September 2014. The lead ship, Beringov Proliv, was delivered by the shipyard on 10 October 2015 and the second vessel of the series, Murman, in late November. The official commissioning ceremonies were held on both vessels in December.

The fourth icebreaking multipurpose salvage vessel included in the federal budget was built to a different design by the Russian-owned Arctech Helsinki Shipyard in Finland in 2014. The vessel, Baltika, is a so-called oblique icebreaker which can break a channel wider than the vessel's beam with its asymmetric hull.

=== MPSV06M ===
One of the thirteen federal-scale national projects adopted by Russia for 2019–2024, Comprehensive plan for modernization and expansion of main infrastructure, included the expansion of the ice-strengthened rescue fleet to support the development of the Northern Sea Route. Among the 16 planned ships were three 7-megawatt icebreaking multipurpose rescue vessels.

In June 2021, the Kaliningrad-based Yantar Shipyard was awarded the construction of the first vessel based on a modernized design referred to as Project MPSV06M. The construction of the second vessel with a contract price of 7.463 billion rubles was awarded to the same shipyard in November 2022. As of December 2023, the vessels Pevek and Anadyr have been laid down with delivery initially scheduled for 2024. In May 2024, the delivery of Pevek was postponed to 2026.

As of December 2023, the construction of the third planned vessel has not been awarded.

== Design ==
All three Project MPSV06 variants are similar in size with length overall of about 85–87 metres (279–285 ft), beam of about 18–19 metres (59–62 ft), draft of about 6–6.5 metres (20–21 ft), and displacement of about 5,000–6,000 tonnes (4,900–5,900 long tons). The general layout of the vessel includes a helideck for Kamov Ka-32 forward, deckhouse amidships, and an open working deck with two 32-tonne cranes, 80-tonne A-frame, and other equipment aft. The vessels have a crew of 26 as well as accommodation for 12 supernumeraries and capacity for 95 survivors.

The ships' fully-integrated diesel-electric power plant consists of four main diesel generators supplying power for both propulsion as well as service loads while underway. In the first three vessels, the main power plant consists of four 3,000-kilowatt (4,000 hp) six-cylinder Wärtsilä 6L32 medium-speed diesel engines. However, the international sanctions against Russia and the Finnish engine manufacturer's exit from the Russian market in 2022 means the same engines cannot be used in the modernized variants.

For main propulsion, all MPSV06 variants are fitted with two 3,500-kilowatt (4,700 hp) electrically-driven azimuth thrusters. Kerchenskiy Proliv was originally provided with Rolls-Royce (today Kongsberg Maritime) Z-drive thrusters which may have become unserviceable while the vessel's construction was suspended. Beringov Proliv and Murman were fitted with ABB Azipod ICE 1400 units. The propulsion equipment selected for Pevek and Anadyr has not been identified. For maneuvering in ports and for dynamic positioning, the vessels have transverse bow thrusters.

All Project MPSV06 variants are strengthened to Russian Maritime Register of Shipping ice class Icebreaker6 which is intended for icebreaking operations in non-Arctic freezing seas where the ice is up to 1.5 metres (5 ft) thick. The vessel's continuous icebreaking capability is 1.5–2 knots (2.8–3.7 km/h; 1.7–2.3 mph) in 1-metre (3.3 ft) level ice with 20–25 centimetres (7.9–9.8 in) snow cover. In open water, the ships have a design speed of 15 knots (28 km/h; 17 mph) and economical speed of 11 knots (20 km/h; 13 mph).

== Ships in class ==
Name	Project	Builder	Yard number	IMO number	Keel laid	Launched	Delivered	Port of registry	Status	Image	Ref
Kerchenskiy Proliv; ex-Spasatel Petr Gruzinskiy	MPSV06	Amur Shipbuilding Plant (Komsomolsk-on-Amur, Russia)	360	9936082	21 July 2010	30 October 2020	28 December 2025	Vladivostok	In service		
Beringov Proliv	MPSV06-NY	Nordic Yards Wismar (Wismar, Germany)	217	9682411	12 November 2013	21 September 2014	10 October 2015	Korsakov	In service		
Murman	MPSV06-NY	Nordic Yards Wismar (Wismar, Germany)	218	9682423	12 November 2013	21 September 2014	21 November 2015	Murmansk	In service		
Pevek	MPSV06M	Yantar Shipyard (Kaliningrad, Russia)			24 March 2022		2024 (initial); 2026 (current estimate)		Under construction		
Anadyr	MPSV06M	Yantar Shipyard (Kaliningrad, Russia)			24 May 2023		2024 (planned)		Under construction		
