= Port of Korsakov =

Seaport in Korsakov, Sakhalin, Russia

Korsakov Sea Trade Port Порт Карсаков
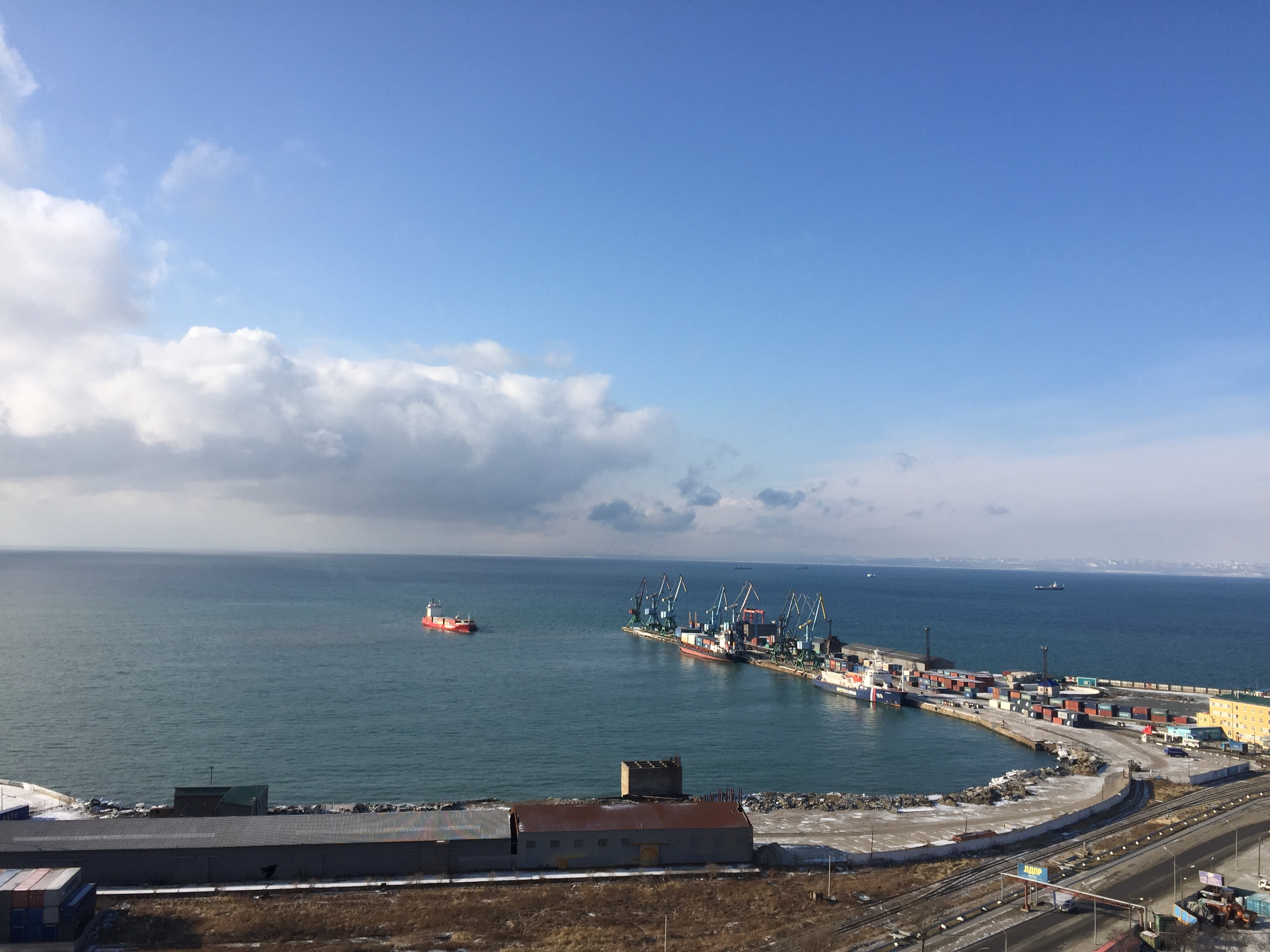
- Click on the map for a fullscreen view

Location
- Country: Russia
- Location: Korsakov
- Coordinates: 46°37′12″N 142°45′46″E
- UN/LOCODE: RUKOR

Details
- Owned by: Korsakov Sea Trade Port OJSC, Petrosakh CJSC, Sakhalin Energy Investment Company Ltd., Pristan LLC, Rosneft-Vostoknefteprodukt LLC and other companies
- No. of berths: 11
- No. of piers: 2

Statistics
- Annual cargo tonnage: ▲1.1 million tonnes (2014)
- Main trades: timber cargo, coal, crude oil and oil products, metal and scrap metal, equipment, containers
- Website kmtp.ru

Port of Korsakov (Russian: Порт Корсаков) is a Russian seaport located on Sakhalin Island, on the shores of Aniva Bay, within the city of Korsakov, Sakhalin Oblast.

The Korsakov Sea Trade Port offers passenger and freight services to the Kuril Islands, maintains constant line communication with South Korea and Vladivostok, and provides direct links with the Wakkanai ferry line (Japan), as well as to Korsakov, the West Coast of the United States, and countries in the Asia-Pacific.

== History ==
The Japanese began construction of the port of Korsakov in 1907. Initially, from 1907 to 1912, a 142-meter-long wooden pier was built on the site of the now-existing South. The depths of the berths were 3 meters. The pier was connected to the shore by a bridge. In 1920, work began on the reconstruction of the pier, and in 1923 the bridge. In 1928, civil engineering work was completed to reconstruct the South Pier, which is a gravitational-type structure. The mooring wall is made of massive folds and a concrete superstructure. The head part is made of reinforced concrete masses of giants installed on a stone bed. An iron-concrete parapet was built to protect against unrest.

Later, work was done to expand the port: in 1939 the North Pier was built, which is a gravitational type structure from giant arrays, the length of the giant array is 15 m, the width is 7.2 m and the height is between 9.4 and 9.65 m. The pier consists of 9 berths with a length of 1,058.7 m. Bank protection in the area of the power plant is 91 m. Out of 9 berths, two berths (Nos. 1, 9) are inactive due to shallow depths.

After the end of World War II and the invasion of South Sakhalin by the Soviet Union, in August 1946, based on cargo turnover and its importance as a transhipment point, the Korsakov Sea Commercial Port was established.

Based on the Decree of the Presidium of the Supreme Union of the RSFSR of July 5, 1946, on the territorial administrative structure of the South Sakhalin Region by order of the Minister of the Navy No. 935 of August 8, 1946, based on cargo turnover, its importance as a transhipment point, its technological equipment for berths, transhipment routes, the Korsakov Sea Trade Port of the first category was created.

The port's structure and functions, the primary standard facilities of the commercial seaport, were approved on October 14, 1947, and announced by order of the Ministry of the Navy No. 373 of October 15, 1947.

In the development of the economy of the young Sakhalin Region, the Korsakov port was a gateway of paramount importance to Sakhalin, a connecting point between the mainland and the island.

Korsakov port is one of the largest ports in the Far East basin, navigable year round.

In 1949, the Sakhalin mainland received mainly grain and food products, building materials, metal and equipment, sent from the Sakhalin region, mainly paper, timber and a number of other goods produced in the Sakhalin region.

To solve production and social issues, the port created the following: Motor depot, on the territory of which there were four repair boxes, six parking boxes for cars, four parking boxes for forklifts.

The energy sector: the primary equipment of a thermal power plant, boiler No. 3, was put into operation in 1952, and boilers No. 1, 2, in 1961. During 1969–1971, all three boilers were converted from solid to liquid fuel. Mechanical workshops are located on the territory of a small bucket.The repair and construction department of the port had a construction yard, a carpentry workshop with machine tools, a sawmill workshop. The port fleet has had 32 submarines since 1949 (tugboats, boats, ram boats, barges).

In the port there was a recreation center "Mayak" in the area of Ozerskoye, a yacht club in the village. First Pad, the Pioneer Camp "Sailor", where the children of port and city workers had a rest, the Vodnik Stadium, where the ice rink worked in the winter. There were also the student's rooms "Albatross" and "Petrel", two well-maintained dormitories where port workers lived.

Three kindergartens Nos. 6, 25, 29 were visited by the children of the port workers; there is a private clinic.

The following events were held: Initiation to Young Workers, the Portovik newspaper was published, an amateur art group was organized, and annual sports and athletics meetings were held.

In 1992, the Port Fleet disconnected and became the Port Fleet small business..

In 1993, housing was transferred to the city administration, and kindergartens also in 1994.

In 1994, the Maritime Administration of the port was established, and the port became an Open Joint-Stock Company, but did not lose its original significance.

From April 5, 1994, to May 30, 1996, the seaport was called the Korsakov Commercial Sea Port Open Joint-Stock Company (based on Decree of the President of the Russian Federation No. 721 of July 1, 1992).

From May 30, 1996, onward, the Commercial Sea Port has been known as the Open Joint-Stock Company Korsakov Sea Commercial Port (KMPP OJSC).

== Description ==
There are 34 berths in the port. There are also subordinate port posts in other settlements.

The port can handle vessels up to 8,000 dwt and drawing 7.5 m draft.

Stevedoring companies are the Korsakov Sea Trade Port OJSC, Petrosakh CJSC, Sakhalin Energy Investment Company Ltd., Pristan LLC, Rosneft-Vostoknefteprodukt LLC (branch No. 5), Sakhalin branch of FSUE Natsrybresurs, LLC "Fishing collective farm named after S.M. Kirov" (p. Ozerskoe). Their equipment includes: 17 gantry cranes, 3 crawler cranes, and 1 truck crane. There are about 32,600 square meters of open areas and 12,700 square meters of covered warehouses.

The port handles timber cargo, coal, crude oil and oil products, metal and scrap metal, equipment, containers, general cargo. Ship repair is in progress.

A railway has been brought to the port. Communication between it and other settlements of the Sakhalin Region is carried out by road and rail, as well as by regular flights of ships.

== Cargo turnover ==
Thousand tons
2003	2004	2005	2006	2007	2008	2009	2010	2011
2,350.8	2,682.6	2,831.9	3,716.4	2,818.4	2,169.1	1,033.2	1,105.6	1,431.6
