= Aniva Bay =

Bay at the southern end of Sakhalin

Coordinates: 46.6°N 142.6°E

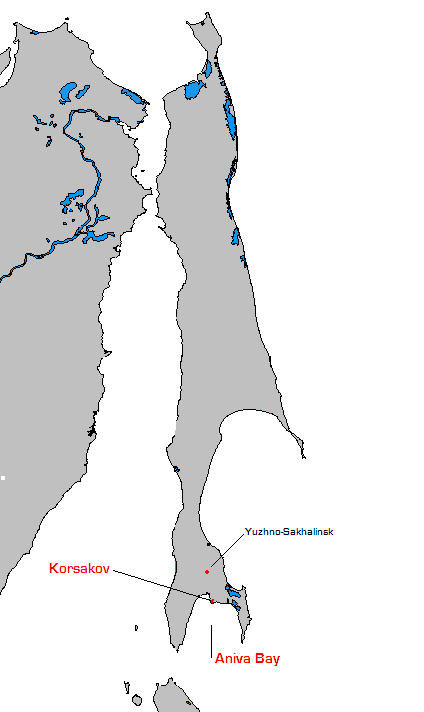
The location of Aniva Bay on the island of Sakhalin

Aniva Bay (Russian: Залив Анива (Zaliv Aniva), Japanese: 亜庭湾, Aniwa Bay, or Aniva Gulf) is located at the southern end of Sakhalin Island, Russia, north of the island of Hokkaidō, Japan. Cape Crillon, the southernmost point of Sakhalin, lies to the west and Cape Aniva lies to the east. The largest city on Aniva Bay is Korsakov.

== History ==
During the Russian colonization of Sakhalin, the settlement of Muravief was established on Aniva Bay, but Japanese opposition led the Russians to abandon most of their settlements on Sakhalin; by 1860, the only Russian settlements on the island were Dui and Kusunai. Japanese fishermen used the bay, but its exposure to south winds prevented heavy settlement. The local Ainu of Aniva Bay adopted Japanese customs, such as shaving the crown of the head and wearing Japanese clothing.

== Geography ==
Between Cape Crillon and Cape Aniva, the bay is sixty-five miles wide. Historically, the bay has been a treasure trove of wildlife: Adam Johann von Krusenstern reported that during the first Russian circumnavigation, whales were so plentiful in Aniva Bay as to pose a navigation hazard to boats coming ashore, and Japanese fishermen in the area were reportedly able to catch fish in buckets during low tide.

Aniva Bay was the main fishing area for Yesso scallops, which were the subject of commercial exploitation by the Japanese fishing industry. Between 1933 and 1943, the annual yield was typically between 1,000 and 2,000 tons. The Soviet Union resumed commercial exploitation of scallops in Aniva Bay using dredging techniques. From a peak harvest of 5,230 tons in 1962, scallop yields collapsed over the next four years to a low of only 30 tons, resulting in a 1967 ban on scallop harvesting in Aniva Bay. The prohibition on fishing dredges in Aniva Bay was not lifted until 2000.

Aniva Bay is the southern terminus of the TransSakhalin pipeline system, which takes gas and condensate to the Prigorodnoye Production Complex and seaport. In 2005, Jan de Nul was contracted to dredge the liquefied natural gas (LNG) terminal at Aniva Bay.

Due to overfishing and heavy development from the oil and gas industry, Aniva Bay was closed to salmon fishing in 2016.

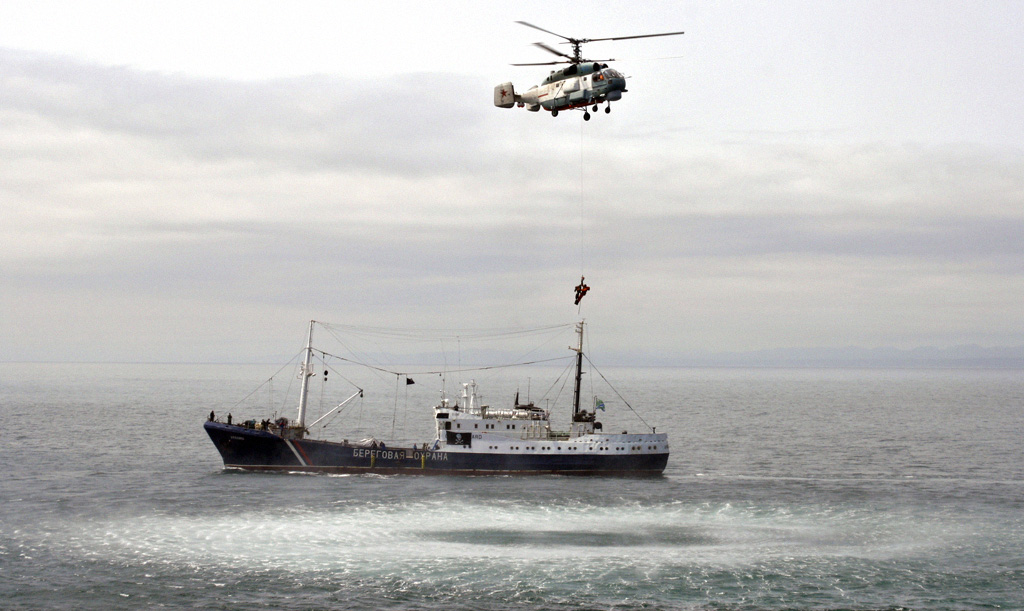
Joint Russian-Japanese coast guard exercise off the coast of Sakhalin

== See also ==
- Sakhalin-II
- Sakhalin-III
