= Nanka Railway =

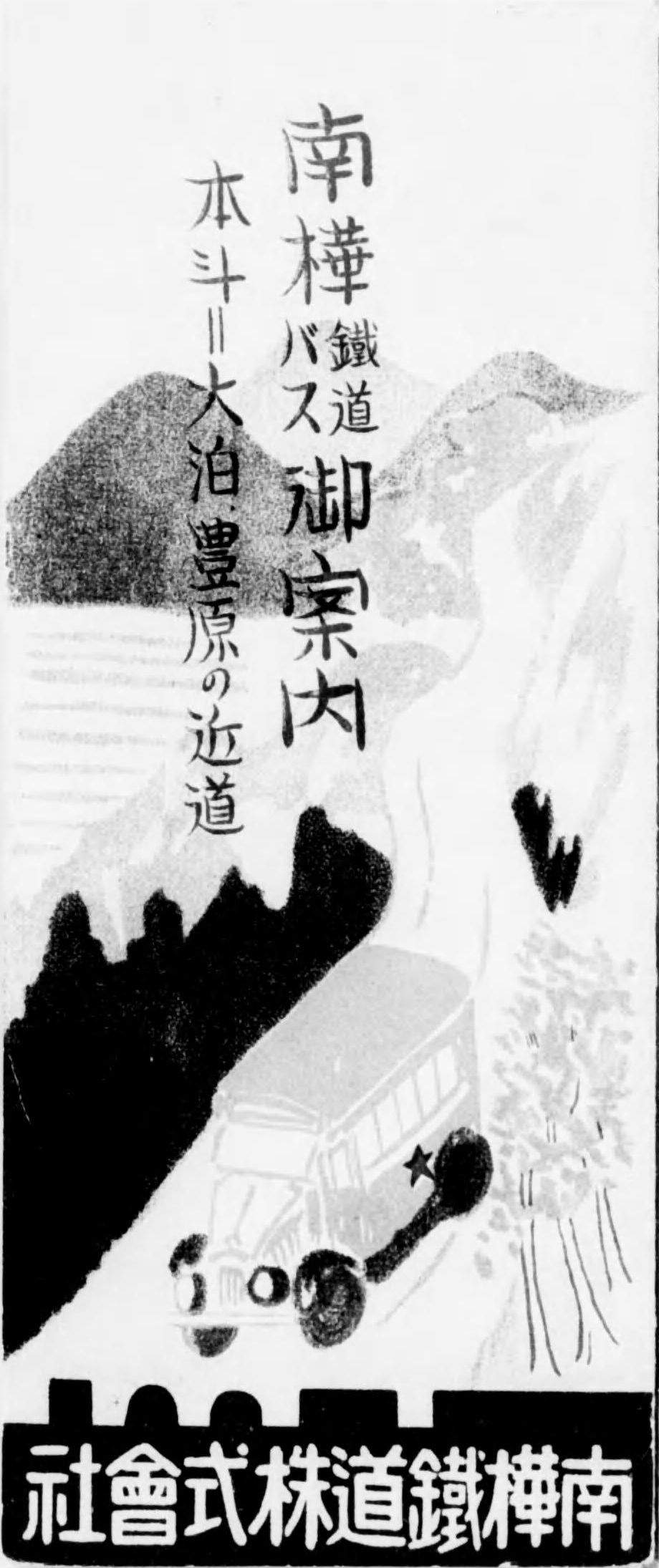
Nanka Railway bus guide with timetable, route map, and sightseeing information (Shōwa era)

Nanka Railway (kyūjitai: 南樺鐵道株式會社; shinjitai: 南樺鉄道株式会社; Nankai Tetsudō kabushiki gaisha) was a private railway company in Karafuto Prefecture during the days of the Empire of Japan. Founded in April 1925 as a subsidiary of Ōji Paper, the company operated the Nanka Line that ran 18.6 km (11.6 mi) from Shinba Station on the East Coast Line to Rūtaka Station in what was then the town of Rūtaka. The company also operated a network of buses connecting Rūtaka and, via Rūtaka, Honto with the prefectural capital of Toyohara and also with Ōdomari, now Korsakov, where passengers could connect with the Chihaku ferry to Wakkanai.

== Nanka Line ==
As published by the Ministry of Railways, as of 1 October 1937 the stations served by the Nanka Railway were as follows:

南樺線 - Nanka Line
Distance		Station name					
Total (km)	S2S (km)	Transcribed, English	Kanji	Modern name	Station opened	Connections	Municipality
0.0	0.0	Shinba	新場	Dachnoye	1926-10-01	East Coast Line	Chitose Village
9.7	9.7	Enoura	江ノ浦		1926-10-01		Rūtaka Town
3.5	13.2	Hamaji	濱路		1926-10-01		Rūtaka Town
2.5	15.7	Hamaji Kōen	濱路公園		1933-06-20		Rūtaka Town
2.9	18.6	Rūtaka	留多加	Aniva	1926-10-01		Rūtaka Town

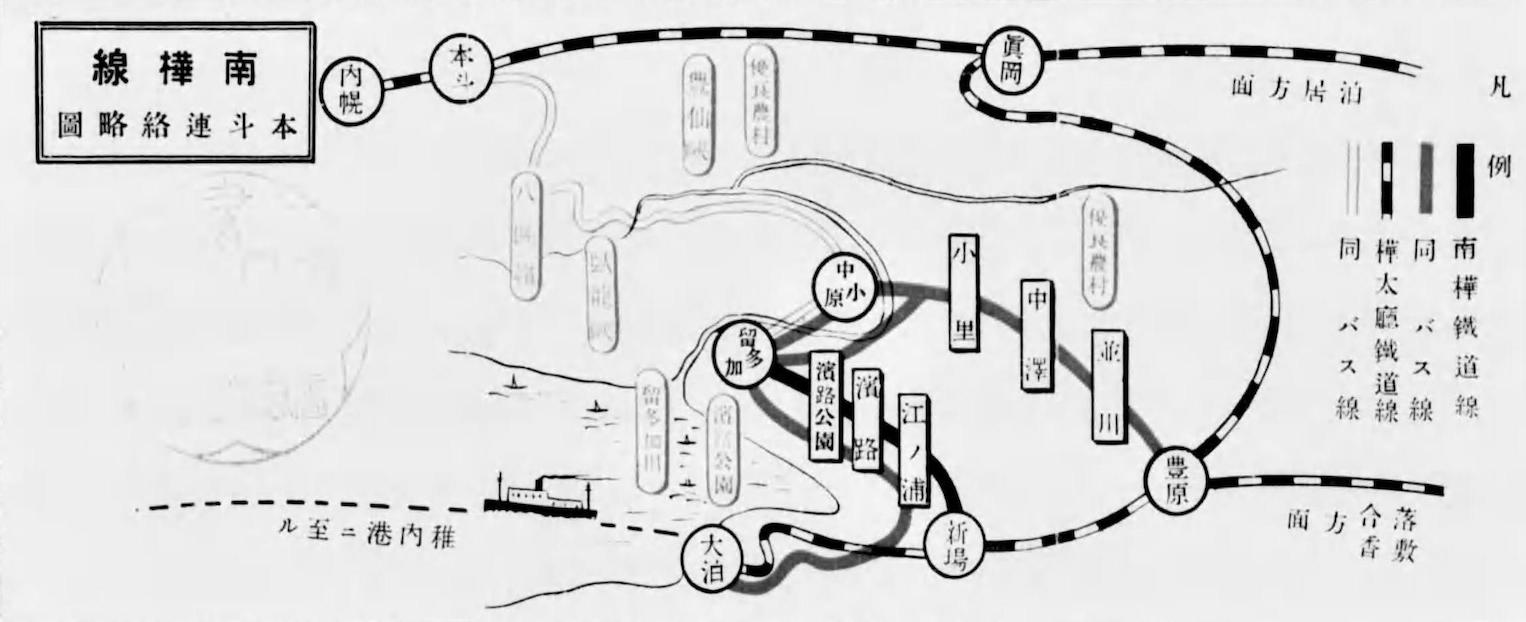
Route map

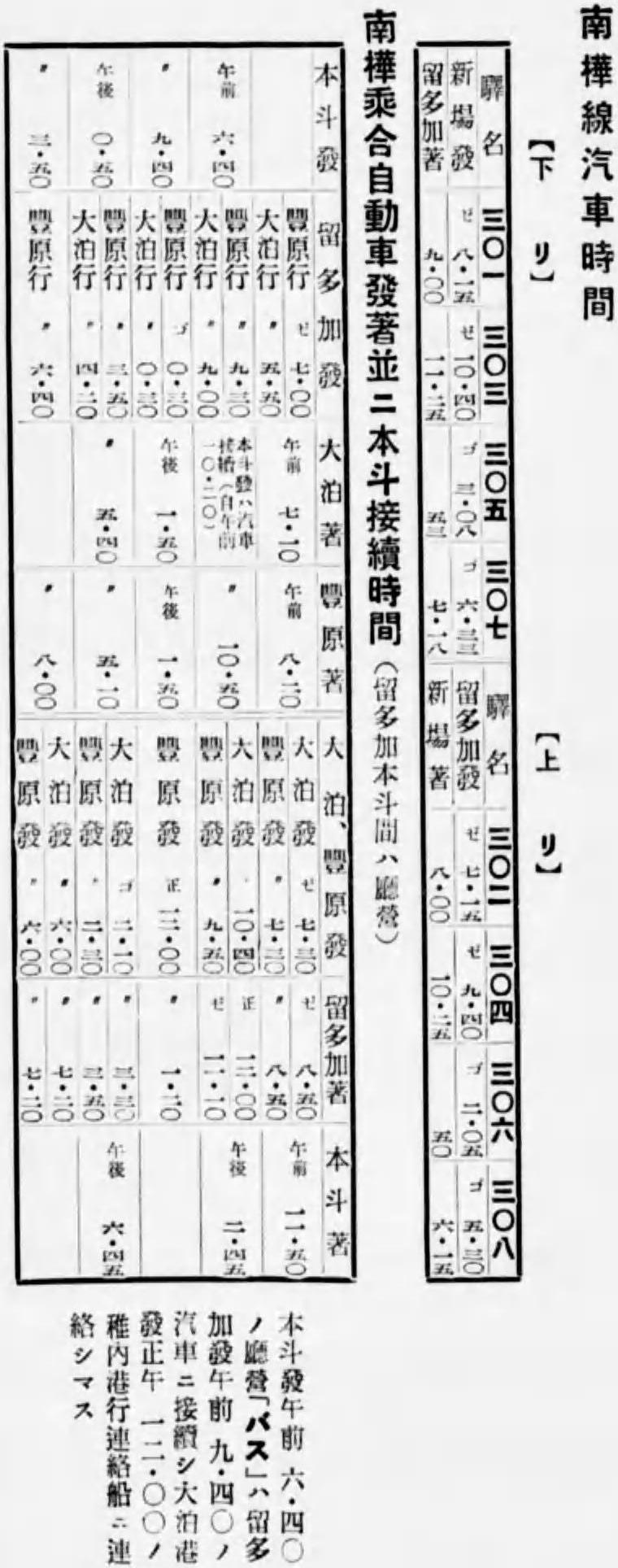
Timetable

== See also ==
- Hōshin Line
- Kawakami Line
