= East Coast Line (Karafuto) =

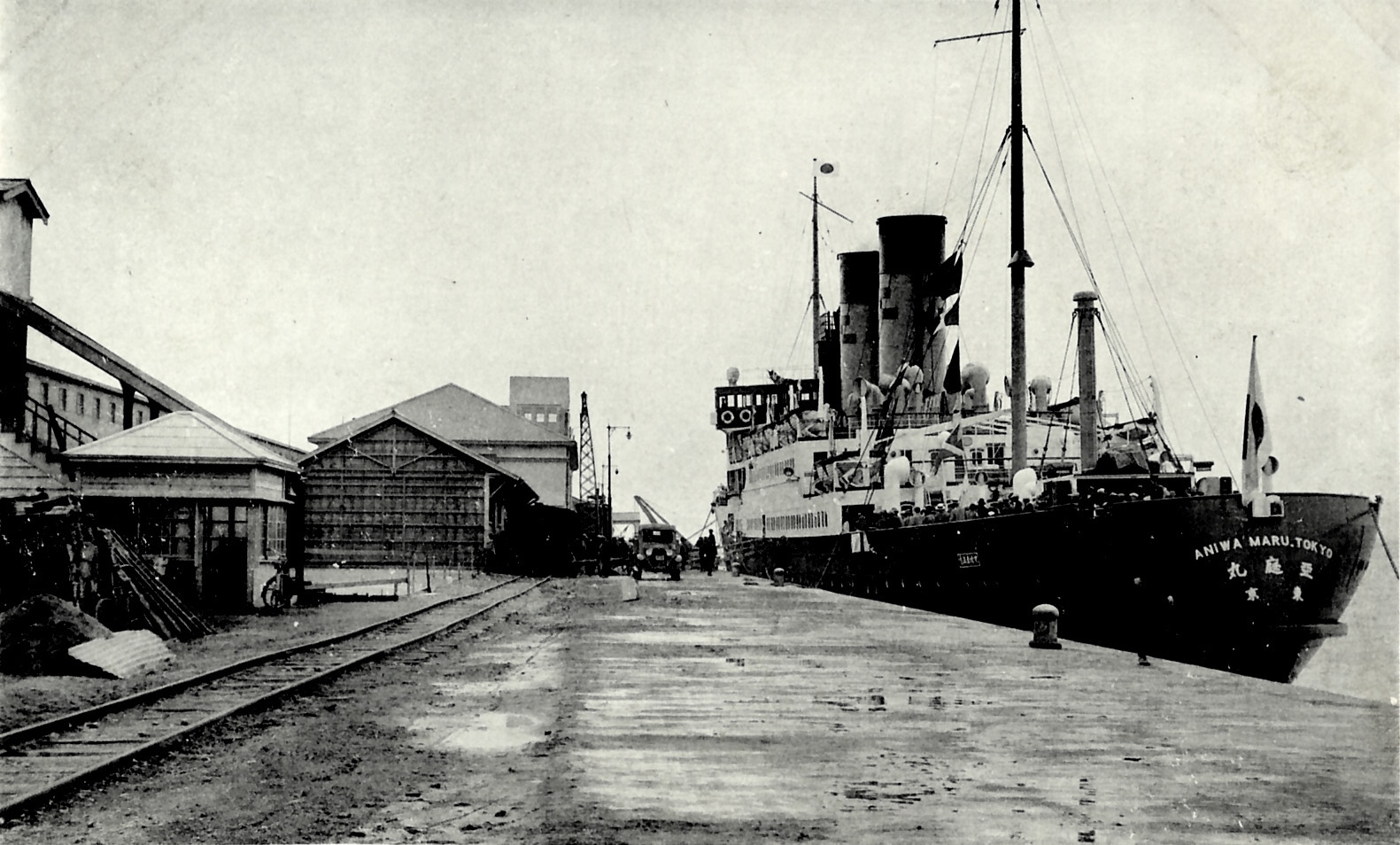
Ōdomari Minato (Port) Station with the Aniwa Maru

The East Coast Line (東海岸線, Higashi-Kaigan-sen) was a railway line in Karafuto Prefecture during the days of the Empire of Japan. By 1937, it ran 95.1 kilometres (59.1 mi) from Ōdomari Port Station in what is now Korsakov to Sakaehama Station.

== Route ==
As published by the Ministry of Railways, as of 1 October 1937 the stations of the East Coast Line were as follows:

東海岸線 - East Coast Line
Distance		Station name					
Total (km)	S2S (km)	Transcribed, English	Kanji	Soviet	Station opened	Connections	Municipality
0.0	0.0	Ōdomari Minato	大泊港		1928-12-05	Chihaku ferry	Ōdomari Town
1.4	1.4	Sakae-machi	栄町		1931-04-01		Ōdomari Town
1.2	2.6	Ōdomari	大泊	Korsakov	1908-06-01		Ōdomari Town
1.3	3.9	Nankei-chō	楠渓町	Старый вокзал	1907-08-01		Ōdomari Town
3.5	7.4	Ichinosawa	一ノ澤		1907-08-01		Chitose Village
1.1	8.5	Ninosawa	二ノ澤		1932-07-01		Chitose Village
2.2	10.7	Sannosawa	三ノ澤		1907-08-01		Chitose Village
2.2	12.9	Minami-Kaizuka	南貝塚		1936-02-01		Chitose Village
1.4	14.3	Kaizuka	貝塚		1907-08-01		Chitose Village
3.4	17.7	Shinba	新場		1926-10-01	Nanka Railway	Chitose Village
5.7	23.4	Nakasato	中里		1907-08-01		Chitose Village
8.1	31.5	Toyonami	豐南		1922-09-16		Toyohara City
6.0	37.5	Ōsawa	大澤		1907-08-01		Toyohara City
4.1	41.6	Toyohara	豐原	Yuzno-Sakhalinsk	1907-08-01	Hōshin Line	Toyohara City
2.2	43.8	Kita-Toyohara	北豐原		1923-10-30		Toyohara City
3.7	47.5	Kusano	草野		1911-07-20		Toyokita Village
2.8	50.3	Minami-Konuma	南小沼		1936-02-11		Toyokita Village
2.2	52.5	Konuma	小沼		1911-07-20	Kawakami Line	Toyokita Village
8.9	61.4	Tomioka	富岡		1911-09-10		Toyokita Village
5.3	66.7	Miyuki	深雪		1911-12-02		Toyokita Village
7.1	73.8	Ōtani	大谷	Sokol	1911-12-02		Ochiai Town
4.9	78.7	Kotani	小谷		1911-12-02		Ochiai Town
6.1	84.8	Ochiai	落合	Dolinsk	1911-12-17		Ochiai Town
10.3	95.1	Sakaehama	栄濱	Starodubskoe Closed 1995	1911-12-02	Sakaehama Coast Branch Line	Sakaehama Village

== See also ==
- West Coast Line
