= Kawakami Line =

Railway line in Karafuto Prefecture

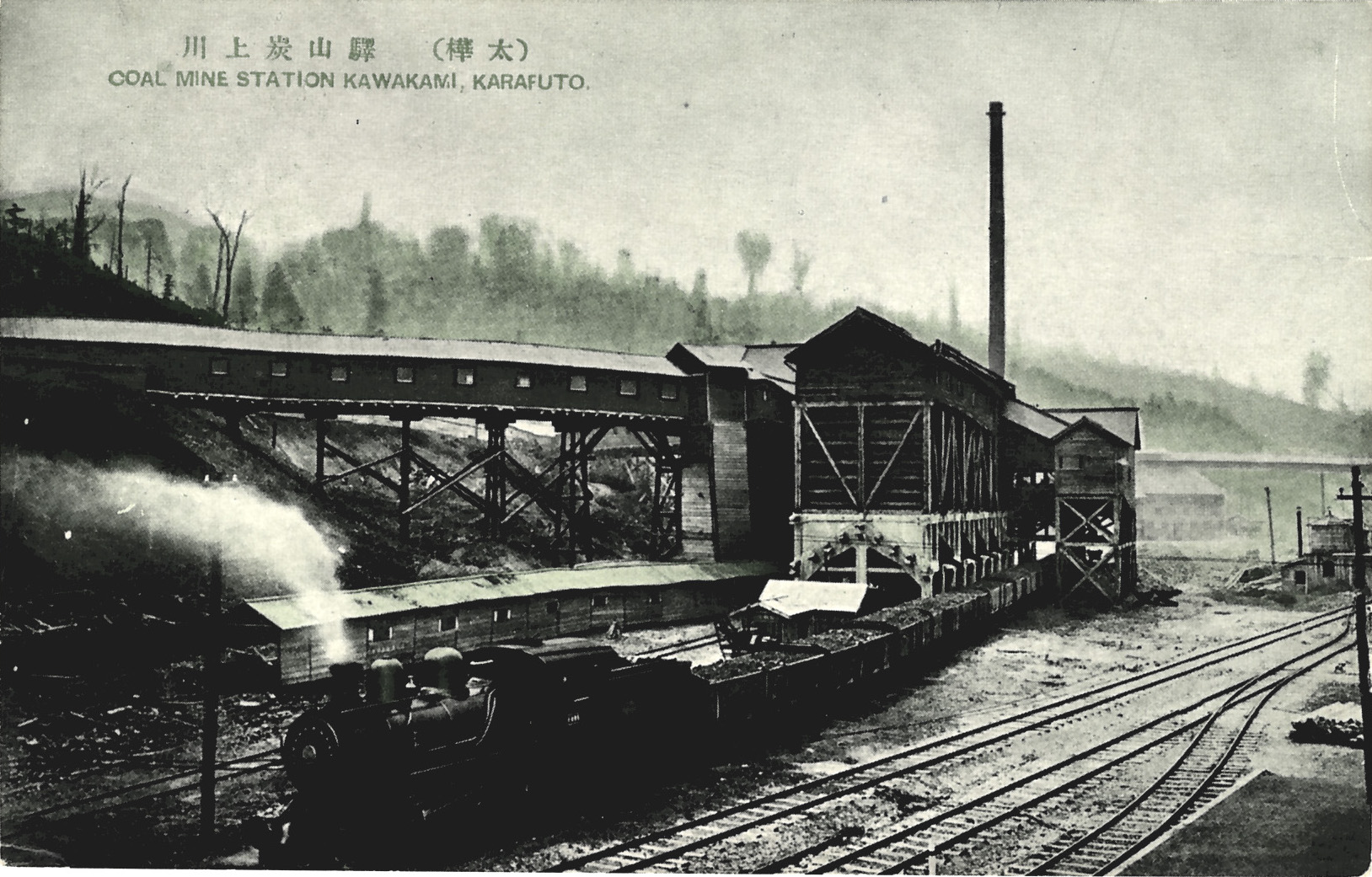
Kawakami Tanzan (Coal Mine) Station

The Kawakami Line (川上線, Kawakami-sen) was a railway line in Karafuto Prefecture during the days of the Empire of Japan. It ran 21.9 kilometres (13.6 mi) from Konuma Station on the East Coast Line to Kawakami Coal Mine Station.

== Route ==
As published by the Ministry of Railways, as of 1 October 1937 the stations of the Kawakami Line were as follows:

川上線 - Kawakami Line
Distance		Station name					
Total (km)	S2S (km)	Transcribed, English	Kanji	USSR	Station opened	Connections	Municipality
0.0	0.0	Konuma	小沼	Новоалександровка	1911-07-20	East Coast Line	Toyokita Village
5.6	5.6	Kawakami	川上	Ключи	1914-04-10		Toyokita Village
5.3	10.9	Kawakami Onsen	川上温泉		1922-10-01		Toyokita Village
2.2	13.1	Oku-Kawakami	奥川上	Тепловодская	1914-04-10		Toyokita Village
5.6	18.7	Nakayama	中山	17 км	1922-10-01		Kawakami Village
3.2	21.9	Kawakami Tanzan	川上炭山	Синегорск	1922-10-01		Kawakami Village

== Russian era ==
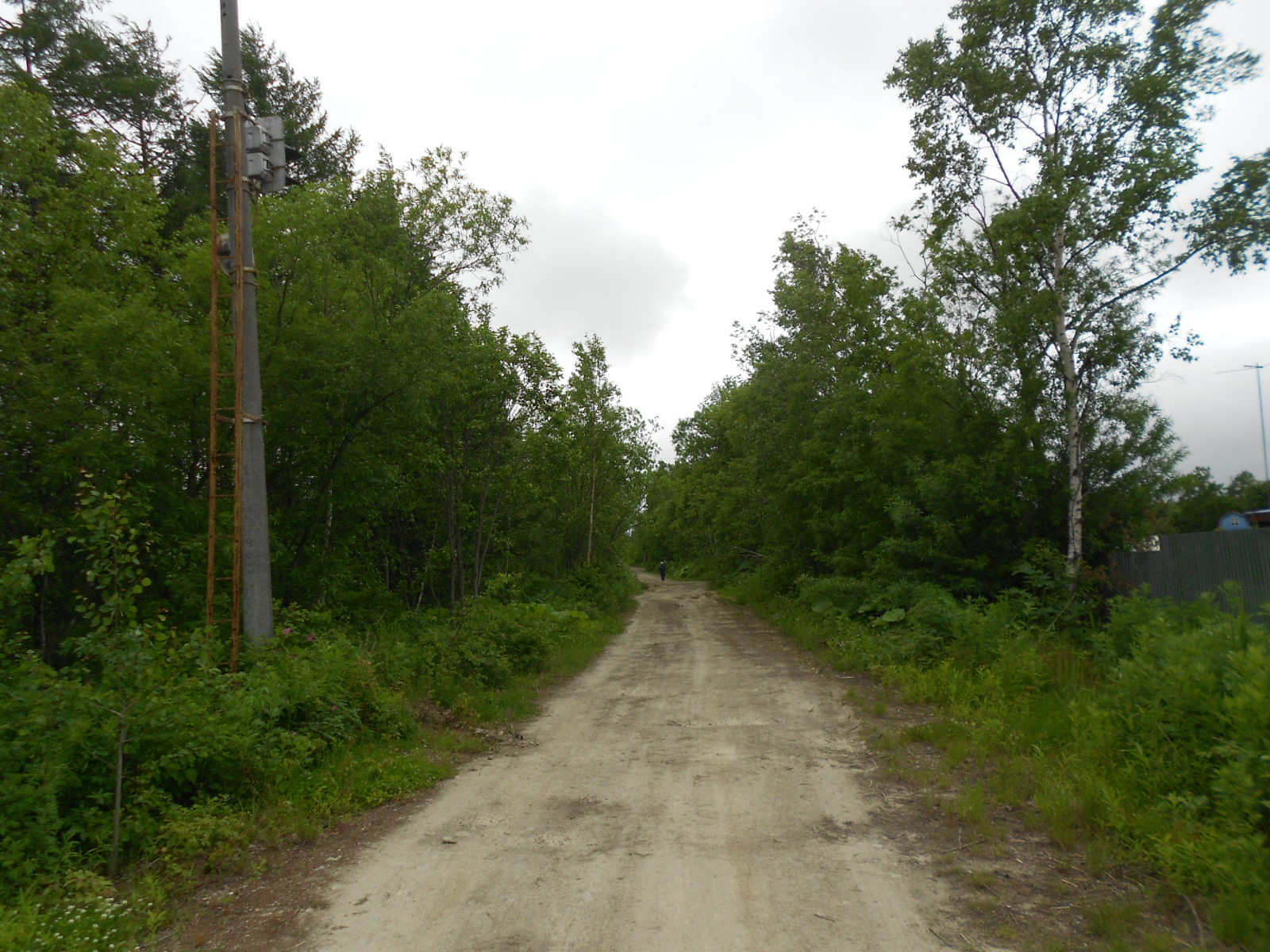
Railway path at 1 km (2016)

This line continue operating by MPS/RZD, end stations were renamed to Novoaleksandrovka and Sinegorsk. Passenger service closed in 1997. Coal mines closed in 2004. Last train was circa 2006. Line was dismantled in 2016-2018.

== See also ==
- Hōshin Line
- Chihaku ferry
