= Hōshin Line =

Railway line in Karafuto Prefecture

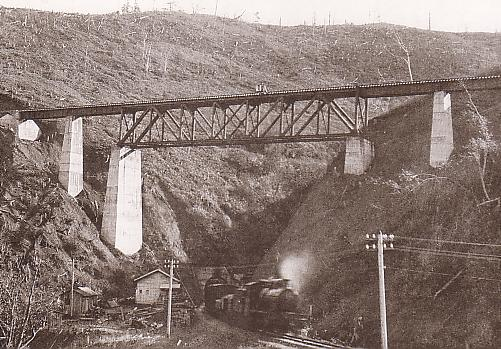
Loop between Takaradai and Ikenohata Stations, place of today Chertov Most end station

The Hōshin Line (kyūjitai: 豐眞線; shinjitai: 豊真線; Hōshin-sen) was a railway line in Karafuto Prefecture during the days of the Empire of Japan. It ran 83.8 kilometres (52.1 mi) from Toyohara Station in what was then the city of Toyohara, to Tei Station in what was then the town of Maoka.

In 1994 middle mountain part of line was closed by MPS of Russia. In 2023 short start and end sections of line operates with commuter trains

== Route ==
As published by the Ministry of Railways, as of 1 October 1937 the stations of the Hōshin Line were as follows:

豐眞線 - Hōshin Line
Distance		Station name				
Total (km)	S2S (km)	Transcribed, English	Kanji	Station opened	Connections	Municipality
0.0	0.0	Toyohara	豊原	1907-08-01	East Coast Line	Toyohara City
5.2	5.2	Nishikubo	西久保	1925-10-01		Toyohara City
4.7	9.9	Suzuya	鈴谷	1925-10-01		Toyokita Village
6.3	16.2	Oku-Suzuya	奥鈴谷	1928-09-03		Toyokita Village
13.4	29.6	Takinosawa	瀧ノ澤	1928-09-03		Toyohara City
12.9	42.5	Nakano	中野	1928-09-03		Shimizu Village
5.3	47.8	Shimizu	清水	1928-09-03		Shimizu Village
4.8	52.6	Ōsaka	逢坂	1926-11-15		Shimizu Village
7.4	60.0	Futamata	二股	1926-11-15		Shimizu Village
9.1	69.1	Takaradai	寶臺	1933-01-15		Shimizu Village
9.2	78.3	Ikenohata	池ノ端	1928-01-18		Maoka Town
5.5	83.8	Tei	手井	1920-10-11	West Coast Line	Maoka Town

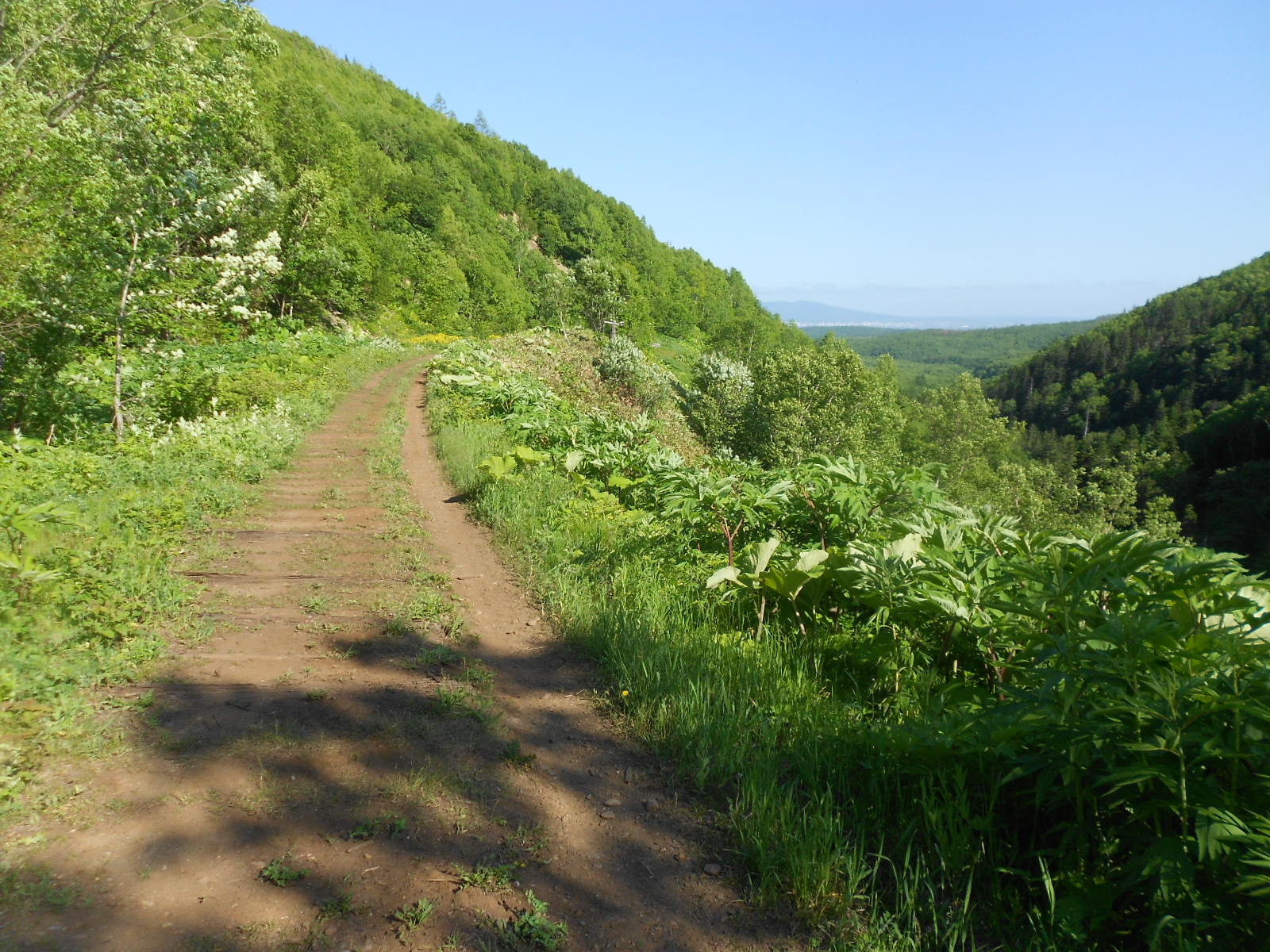
Closed mountain railway section, with Yuzno-Sakhalinsk visible in distant (2016)

Line was fully operated by Soviet Railways until 1994, when middle mountain section was abandoned due to technical conditions of tunnels.

East section Yuzno-Sakhalinsk - Novoderevenskaya was operated until 2019 for dacha commuter service. Since 2019 operated short section to station Dalneye for city trains.

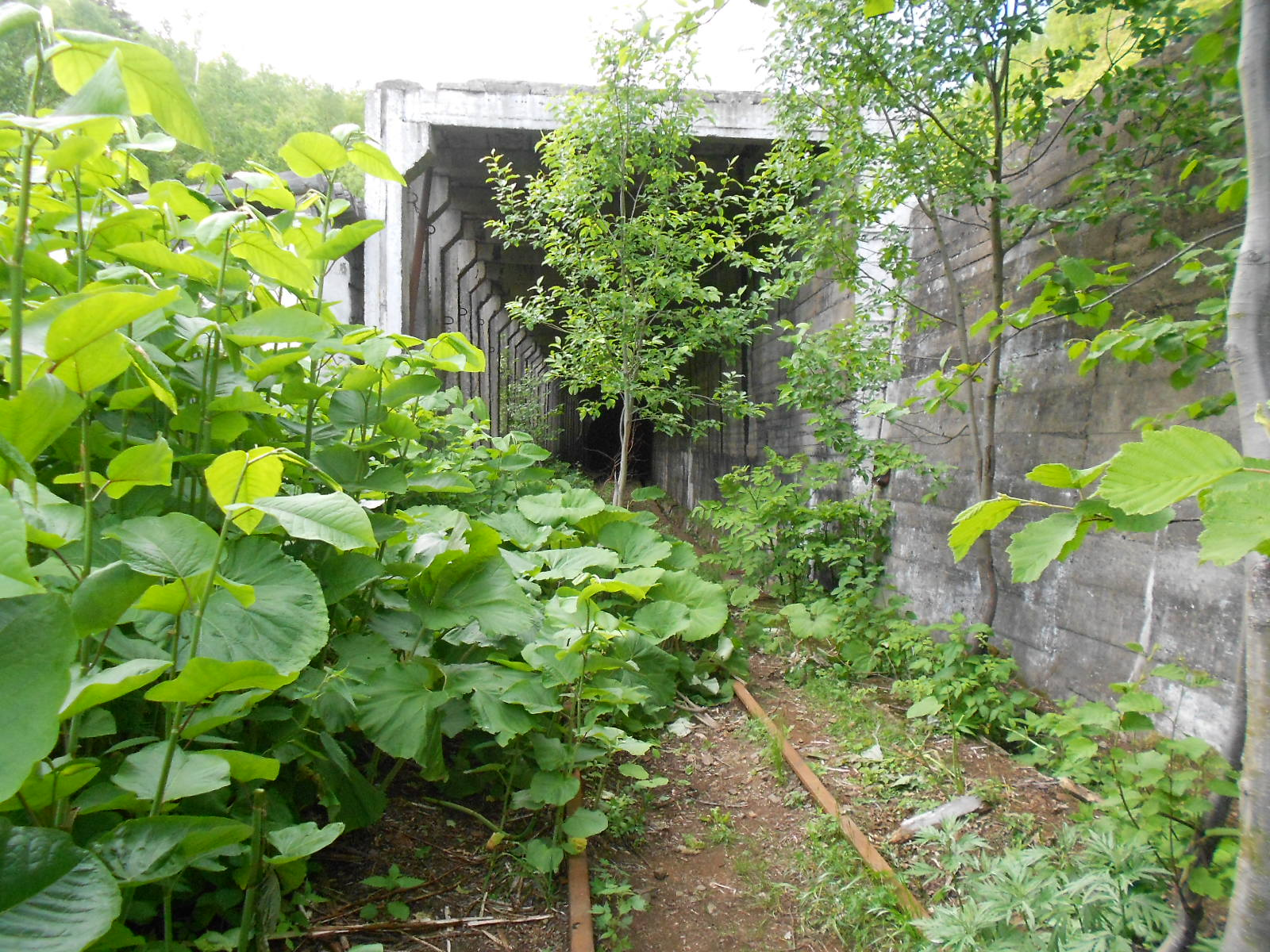
One of tunnels at west part of line (2016)

West section Holmsk - Chertov Most was regauged to Russian gauge in 2020, and operated for commuter or tourist traffic.
