= Makarye =

Makarye (Russian: Макарье) is the name of several rural localities (villages and selos) in Russia:

- Makarye, Kiknursky District, Kirov Oblast, a selo in Vashtrangsky Rural Okrug of Kiknursky District of Kirov Oblast
- Makarye, Kotelnichsky District, Kirov Oblast, a selo in Makaryevsky Rural Okrug of Kotelnichsky District of Kirov Oblast
- Makarye, Voronezh Oblast, a selo in Orlovskoye Rural Settlement of Novousmansky District of Voronezh Oblast
