= Makarye, Voronezh Oblast =

Makarye Макарье
- Selo
- Interactive map of Makarye
- Location of Makarye Makarye (Voronezh Oblast)
- Coordinates: 51°46′31″N 39°39′11″E
- Country: Russia
- Federal subject: Voronezh Oblast
- Administrative district: Novousmansky District
- Rural settlementSelsoviet: Orlovskoye Rural Settlement

Population
  - Estimate (October 2005): 580 )
- Time zone: UTC+3 (MSK)
- Postal code: 396303
- OKTMO ID: 20625480111

Makarye (Russian: Макарье) is a rural locality (a selo) in Novousmansky District of Voronezh Oblast, Russia, located on the Makariy River 23.8 kilometers (14.8 mi) northeast from the district's administrative center of Novaya Usman and connected to Orlovo with a 5-kilometer (3.1 mi) road. Population: 580 (2005 est.).
