= Sakhalin International School =

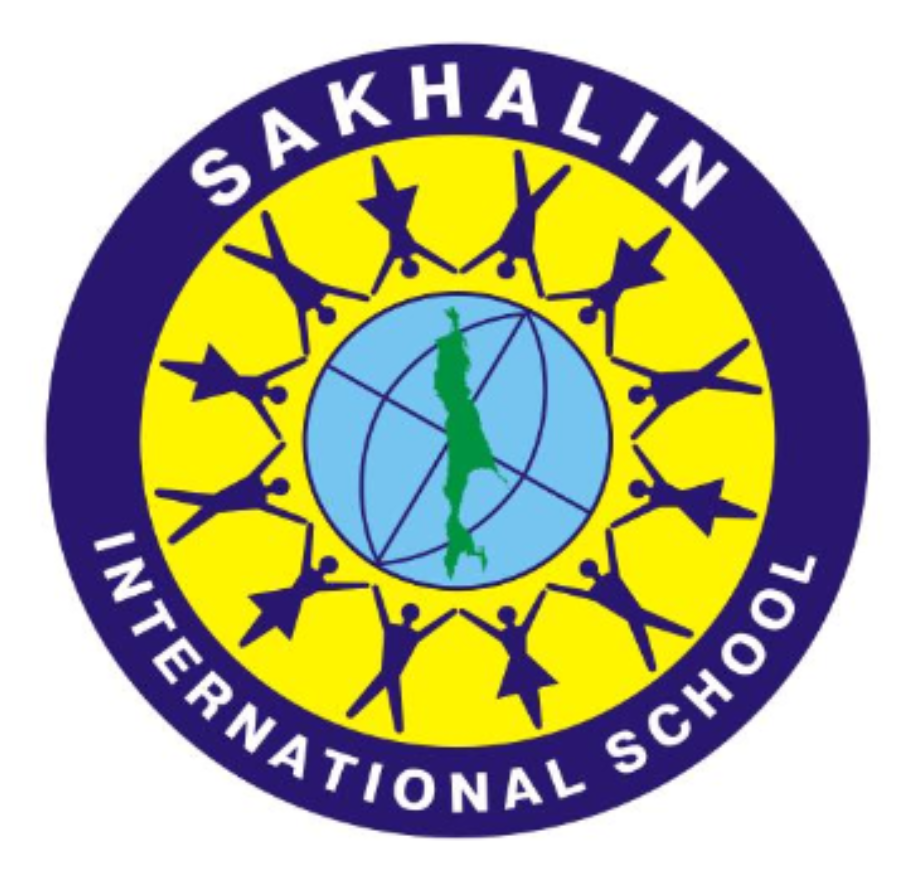
- Yuzhno-Sakhalinsk, Sakhalin Oblast; Russia

Information
- School type: International
- Established: 1998
- Status: Closed
- Closed: March 2022
- Ofsted: Reports
- Headmaster: Tim Robinson
- Teaching staff: 16
- Gender: Mixed
- Age range: 3-14
- Language: English
- Website: http://sakhalinschool.net
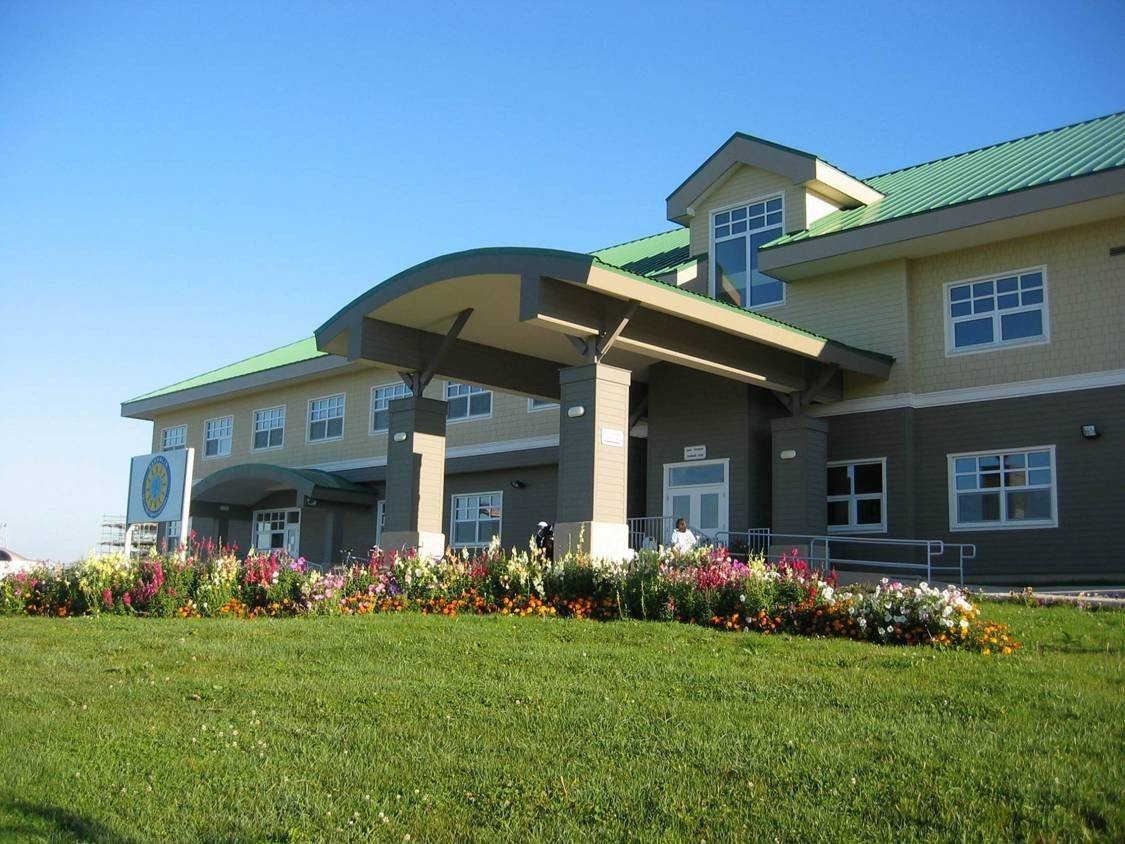

Sakhalin International School (SIS) was a private international primary school located in Yuzhno-Sakhalinsk, Russia. It was established in 1998 to provide quality education to expatriate students, sponsored by Shell and Sakhalin Energy.

== Curriculum ==
The school followed the International Early Year, Primary and Middle Years Curriculums. The language of instruction was English
