= Political divisions of Karafuto Prefecture =

Between 1905 and 1945, the Empire of Japan administered the southern half of Sakhalin, using the name Karafuto (樺太). The area was designated a chō (廳), the same term given to Hokkaidō at the time. It is commonly referred to as Karafuto Prefecture in English. The prefecture was divided into 4 subprefectures (支廳, shichō), which in turn were subdivided into 11 districts, in turn divided into 41 municipalities (1 city, 13 towns, and 27 villages)

== List of municipalities of Karafuto Prefecture ==
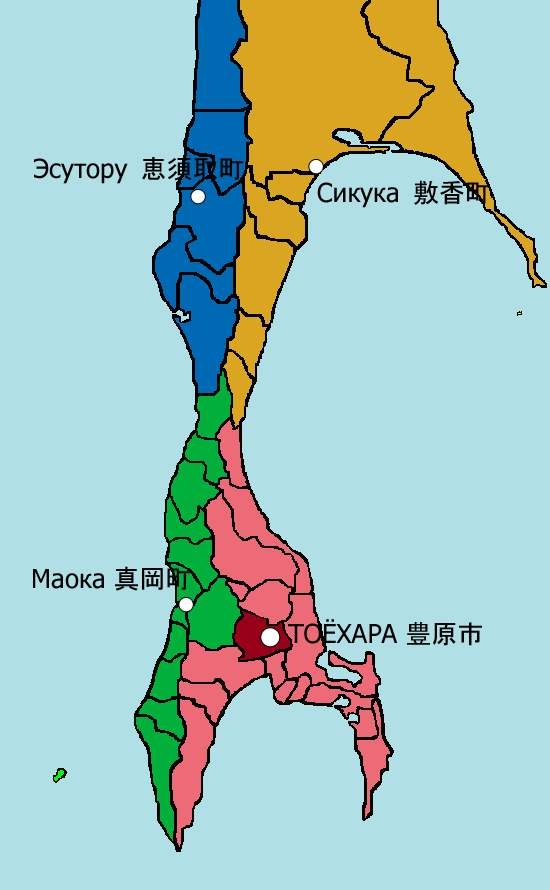
Karafuto Prefecture with 4 subprefectures, namely Toyohara, Maoka, Esutoru and Shikuka. Toyohara City was also a part of Toyohara Subprefecture.

Prefectural capital: Toyohara

Notes

- The data is as of 1945.
- Some municipalities had multiple possible readings. 敷香, for instance, was read Shikuka, Shisuka, or Shikika, depending on sources.
- All Kanji names are in Shinjitai, a modern form which was not used when the prefecture existed. The Kyūjitai names used when the prefecture existed are listed in parentheses.
- The list shows the current Russian names in parentheses. However, Russian divisions do not match with Japanese divisions. These names just roughly overlap with central towns.

=== Toyohara Subprefecture 豊原支庁 (豐原支廳) ===
Subprefectural capital: Toyohara

- Ōtomari District, alternatively Ōdomari 大泊郡
  - Chitose Village 千歳村 (千歲村, Tret'ya Pad)
  - Fukami Village 深海村 (深海村, Prigorodnoye)
  - Nagahama Village 長浜村 (長濱村, Ozyorskoye)
  - Ōtomari Town, alternatively Ōdomari 大泊町 (Korsakov)
  - Shiretoko Village 知床村 (Novikovo)
  - Tōbuchi Village 遠淵村 (Murav'yovo)
  - Tomuna Village 富内村 (富內村, Okhotskoye)
- Rūtaka District, alternatively Rutaka 留多加郡
  - Notoro Village 能登呂村 (Kirillovo)
  - Rūtaka Town, alternatively Rutaka 留多加町 (Aniva)
  - Sango Village 三郷村 (三鄕村, Taranay)
- Toyohara City 豊原市 (豐原市, Yuzhno-Sakhalinsk)
- Toyosakae District 豊栄郡 (豐榮郡, Vysokoye)
  - Kawakami Village 川上村 (Sinegorsk)
  - Ochiai Town 落合町 (Dolinsk)
  - Sakaehama Village 栄浜村 (榮濱村, Starodubskoye)
  - Shiranui Village 白縫村 (Vzmorye)
  - Toyokita Village 豊北村 (豐北村, Lugovoye)

=== Maoka Subprefecture 真岡支庁 (眞岡支廳) ===
Subprefectural capital: Maoka

- Honto District 本斗郡
  - Honto Town 本斗町 (Nevelsk)
  - Kaiba Village 海馬村 (Moneron Island)
  - Kōni Village 好仁村 (Shebunino)
  - Naihoro Town 内幌町 (內幌町, Gornozavodsk)
- Maoka District 真岡郡 (眞岡郡)
  - Hirochi Village 広地村 (廣地村, Pravda)
  - Konotoro Village 小能登呂村 (Kostromskoye)
  - Maoka Town 真岡町 (眞岡町, Kholmsk)
  - Noda Town 野田町 (Chekhovo)
  - Randomari Village 蘭泊村 (Yablochny)
  - Shimizu Village 清水村 (淸水村, Chaplakovo)
- Tomarioru District 泊居郡
  - Kushunnai Village 久春内村 (久春內村, Ilyinskoye)
  - Nayori Village 名寄村 (Penzenskoye)
  - Tomarioru Town 泊居町 (Tomari)

=== Esutoru Subprefecture 恵須取支庁 (惠須取支廳) ===
Subprefectural capital: Esutoru

- Esutoru District 恵須取郡 (惠須取郡)
  - Chinnai Town 珍内町 (珍內町, Krasnogorsk)
  - Esutoru Town 恵須取町 (惠須取町, Uglegorsk)
  - Tōro Town 塔路町 (Shakhtyorsk)
  - Ushiro Village 鵜城村 (Orlovo)
- Nayoshi District 名好郡
  - Nayoshi Town 名好町 (Lesogorskoye)
  - Nishisakutan Village 西柵丹村 (Boshnyakovo)

=== Shikuka Subprefecture 敷香支庁 (敷香支廳) ===
Subprefectural capital: Shikuka

- Motodomari District, alternatively Mototomari 元泊郡
  - Hoyori Village 帆寄村 (Pugachevo)
  - Motodomari Village, alternatively Mototomari 元泊村 (Vostochny)
  - Shirutoru Town, alternatively Shiritori 知取町 (Makarov)
- Shikuka District, alternatively Shisuka or Shikika 敷香郡
  - Chirie Village 散江村 (Kotikovo)
  - Nairo Village 内路村 (內路村, Gastello)
  - Shikuka Town, alternatively Shisuka or Shikika 敷香町 (Poronaysk)
  - Tomarikishi Village 泊岸村 (Vakhrushev)

== See also ==
- Administrative divisions of Sakhalin Oblast
