= Lugovoye, Ivanovsky District, Amur Oblast =

Lugovoye Луговое
- Selo
- Location within Amur Oblast Location within Russia
- Coordinates: 50°25′N 128°07′E
- Country: Russia
- Region: Amur Oblast
- District: Ivanovsky District
- Time zone: UTC+9:00

Lugovoye (Russian: Луговое) is a rural locality (a selo) in Ivanovsky Selsoviet of Ivanovsky District, Amur Oblast, Russia. The population was 234 as of 2018. There are 2 streets.

== Geography ==
Lugovoye is located on the right bank of the Ivanovka River, 14 km northeast of Ivanovka (the district's administrative centre) by road. Bolsheozyorka is the nearest rural locality.
