= North Breakwater Dome =

- 北防波堤ドーム
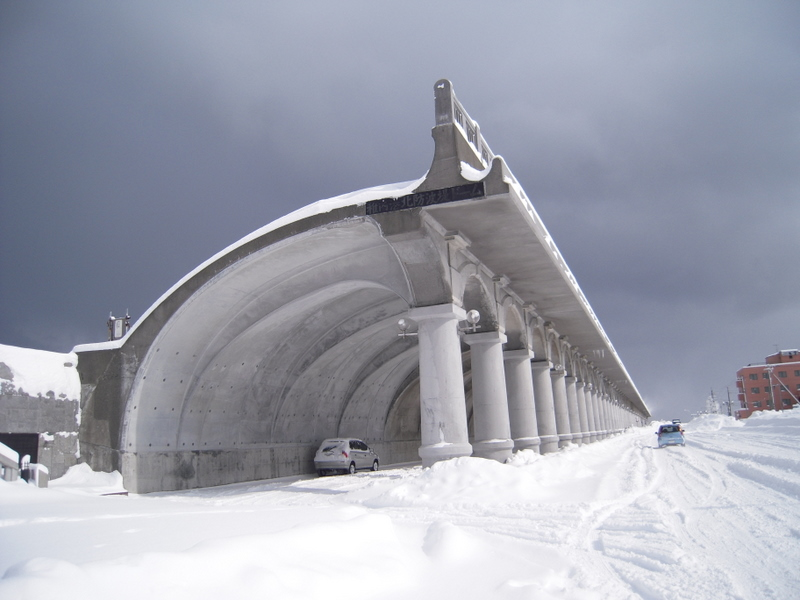
- Interactive map of the North Breakwater Dome area

General information
- Location: 1 Kaiun, Wakkanai, Hokkaidō, Japan
- Coordinates: 45°25′13″N 141°40′50″E
- Opened: 1936
- Renovated: 1978–1981

Design and construction
- Architect: Tsuchiya Minoru

The North Breakwater Dome (北防波堤ドーム, kita bōhatei dōmu) is a long arched "semi-domical" structure in the port area of Wakkanai, Hokkaidō, Japan. Rising to a height of 13.6 metres (45 ft) above the sea and extending some 427 metres (1,401 ft), with seventy columns, an intercolumniation of 6 metres (20 ft), and a width from column to wall of 8 metres (26 ft), the form, inspired by a Roman arcade, is said to be without parallel.

== History ==
In accordance with the 1905 Treaty of Portsmouth, South Sakhalin was incorporated into the Empire of Japan and governed as Karafuto Prefecture. To improve maritime connections between Wakkanai and Sakhalin, between 1910 and 1919 plans were laid for the redevelopment of the old fishing port of Wakkanai, with civil engineer Itō Chōemon (伊藤長右衛門) in charge. Measures included a 1,330 metres (4,360 ft) north breakwater to protect the port from windstorms and high waves, paired with a 545 metres (1,788 ft) sand groin to the south to enclose the port, together with land reclamation and the construction of moorings. Initial plans for the north breakwater were for its parapet to rise to a height of 5.5 metres (18 ft), but this was considered insufficient to withstand winter storms. A revised design was formulated by twenty-six year-old Tsuchiya Minoru (土谷実), a graduate of the Department of Civil Engineering at Hokkaidō Imperial University. Construction of the breakwater began in 1920, with works on the North Breakwater Dome carried out from 1931 and completed in 1936. The superstructure is supported by reinforced concrete piles on the inner side and rests on the reinforced concrete body of the breakwater facing the sea; it is topped with a parapet nearly 3 metres (9.8 ft) high.

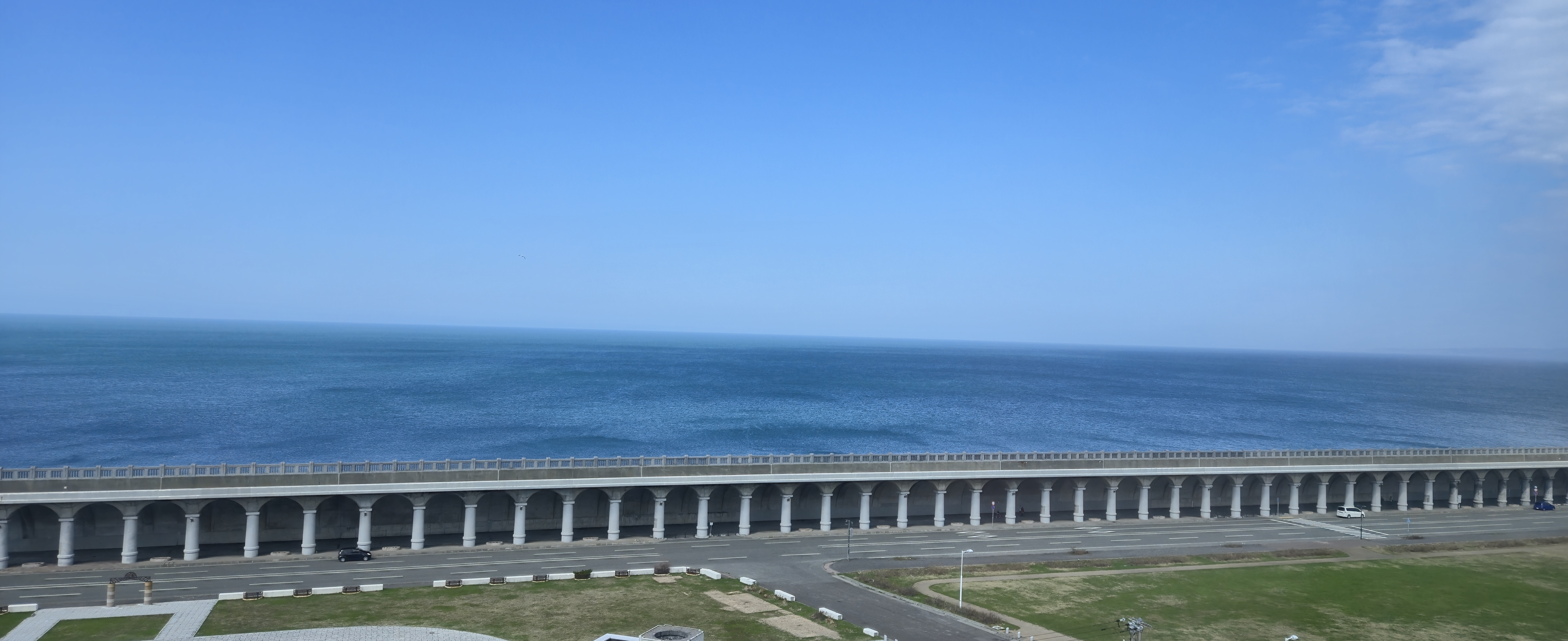
North Breakwater Dome in front of Sōya Bay, May 2025

The shipping route to Korsakov opened in 1923, that to Nevelsk the following year. From 1938 to 1945 there was a railway station in the Dome. With the end of the war and interruption of ties with Sakhalin, the station closed, and the Dome came to be used for coal storage. By the late 1960s the concrete of the Dome was deteriorating, with the volumetric expansion of the corroding steel used for reinforcement, after many cycles of freezing and thawing, and the action of salts. Reconstruction began in 1978 and was completed in 1981. In 2001, the North Breakwater Dome of Wakkanai Port was among the first assets to be listed as Hokkaidō Heritage.

== See also ==
- List of Cultural Properties of Japan - structures (Hokkaidō)
- Cape Sōya
