= Tomari, Russia =

Town in Sakhalin Oblast, Russia

Tomari Томари
- Town
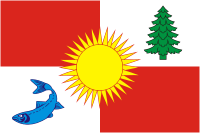
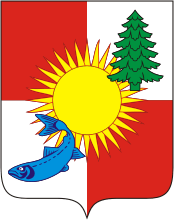
- Flag Coat of arms
- Interactive map of Tomari
- Location of Tomari Tomari (Sakhalin Oblast)
- Coordinates: 47°46′N 142°04′E
- Country: Russia
- Federal subject: Sakhalin Oblast
- Administrative district: Tomarinsky District
- Founded: 1870
- Town status since: 1946

Government
  - Mayor: Anatoly Degtyaryov
- Elevation: 20 m (66 ft)

Population (2010 Census)
  - Total: 4,541
  - Estimate (2023): 4,299 (−5.3%)

Administrative status
  - Capital of: Tomarinsky District

Municipal status
  - Urban okrug: Tomarinsky Urban Okrug
  - Capital of: Tomarinsky Urban Okrug
- Time zone: UTC+11 (MSK+8)
- Postal code: 694820
- Dialing code: +7 42446
- OKTMO ID: 64748000001
- Website: www.adm-tomari.ru

Tomari population
- 2010 Census: 4,541
- 2002 Census: 5,338
- 1989 Census: 8,121
- 1979 Census: 7,797

Tomari (Russian: Томари) is a coastal town and the administrative center of Tomarinsky District in Sakhalin Oblast, Russia, located on the western coast of the Sakhalin Island, 167 kilometers (104 mi) northwest of Yuzhno-Sakhalinsk, the administrative center of the oblast. As of the 2010 Census, its population was 4,541.

== History ==
The bay on which Tomari now stands was visited between July 12 and 14, 1787 by two French frigates, Boussole and Astrolabe, commanded by Lapérouse. The French named it Langle Bay after the captain of the Astrolabe. At that time, it was no more than a small cluster of huts. The French had good relations with the local people who they considered to be in the very distant past of northern Chinese origin, describing them as intelligent, good-looking, and short in stature. The locals were engaged primarily in fishing, hunting, and herding, with hardly any agriculture. They traded regularly with the communities on the Amur River on the mainland and with Japan. Lapérouse gives a very detailed description of his relations with these people in his work Voyage de Laperouse Autour du Monde, published in 1797.

Modern Tomari was founded in 1870. Along with the rest of the southern portion of Sakhalin, it was placed under Japanese control by the Treaty of Portsmouth in 1905 and remained so until 1945, during which time it bore the name of Tomarioru (泊居), derived from an Ainu term meaning on the bay. It reverted to the Soviet Union in 1945 and was granted town status and renamed Tomari in 1946. The town name etymology is "bay" Tomari is one of the few Ainu place names in Sakhalin that wasn't renamed from the Japanese administration era.

== Administrative and municipal status ==
Within the framework of administrative divisions, Tomari serves as the administrative center of Tomarinsky District and is subordinated to it. As a municipal division, the town of Tomari and thirteen rural localities of Tomarinsky District are incorporated as Tomarinsky Urban Okrug.

== Economy ==
Fish, coil, and timber are extracted in the town. The largest industrial facility in the town, a paper factory, went bankrupt in the mid-1990s; its collapse provoked a large emigration.

=== Transportation ===
The town lies on the Sakhalin Railway connecting Kholmsk with Ilyinskoye.

== Sister city ==
- Teshio, Hokkaido, Japan
