= Yuzhno-Sakhalinsk railway station =

Railway station in Russia

Coordinates: 46°57′27″N 142°43′33″E

Yuzhno-Sakhalinsk Южно-Сахалинск
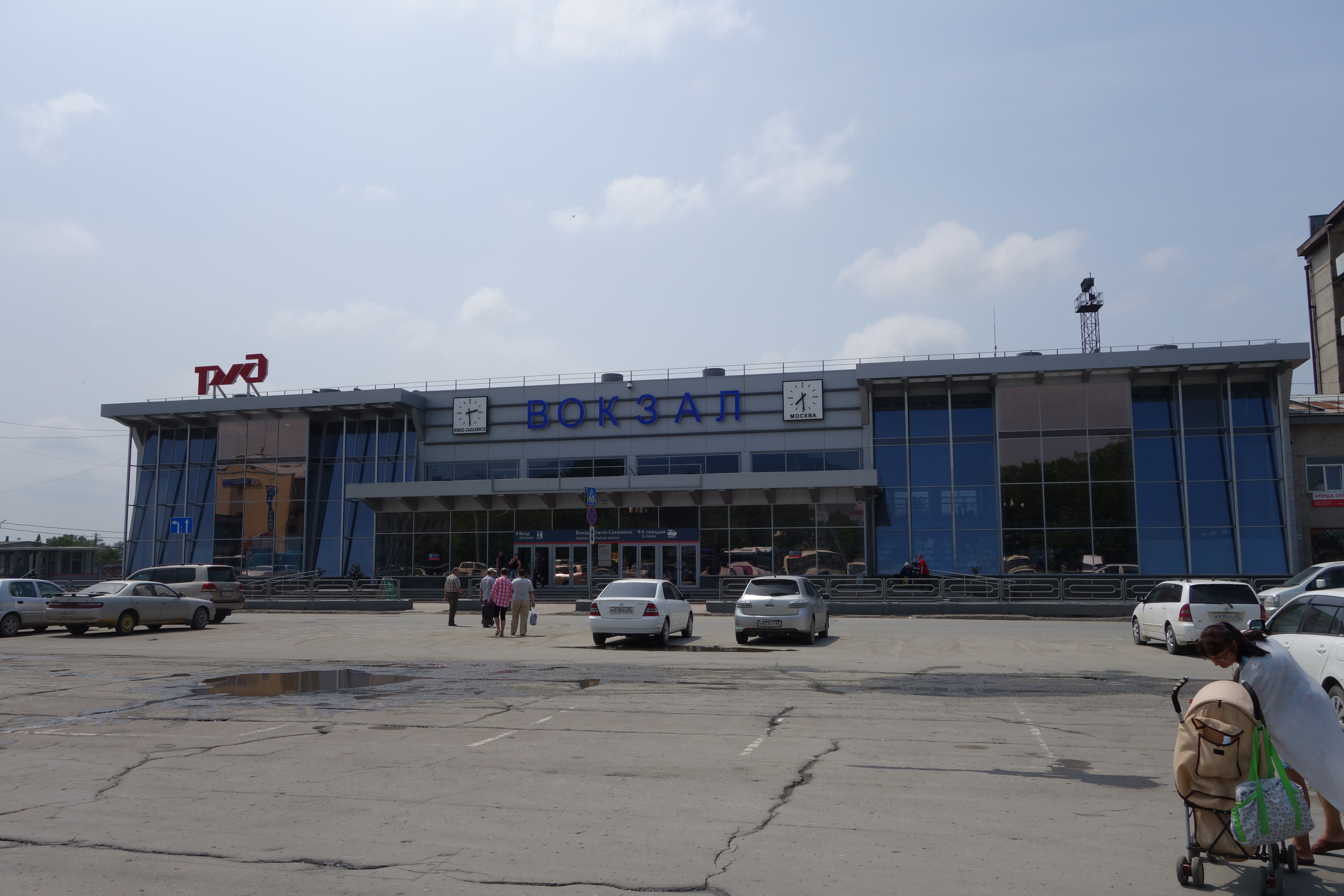

General information
- Location: Ulitsa Vokzal'naya, 54, Yuzhno-Sakhalinsk; Sakhalin Oblast; Russia
- Owner: Russian Railways
- Operator: Far Eastern Railway
- Line: Sakhalin Railway Division
- Platforms: 2
- Tracks: 2
- Connections: Local transportation

Construction
- Structure type: At-grade
- Parking: Kommunistichesky Ave., 86B Parking

History
- Opened: 1906
- Former names: Vladimirovka (1906–1908); Toyohara (1908–1946)
Route map
Location

Yuzhno-Sakhalinsk railway station (Russian: Станция Южно-Сахалинск) is railway station of Sakhalin Railway in Yuzhno-Sakhalinsk, Sakhalin Oblast, Russia. The station belongs to the Far Eastern Railway.

== History ==
This station was opened in 1906 as Vladimirovka Station as part of the Korsakov (Ōdomari) - Yuzhno-Sakhalinsk (Toyohara) line. In 1908, this station was renamed Toyohara Station (Japanese: 豊原駅). In 1911, the Yuzhno-Sakhalinsk–Novoaleksandrovka (Konuma) line opened. In 1925, the Yuzhno-Sakhalinsk–Kurskaya–Sakhalinskaya (Suzuya) line opened and the station became a hub. In 1946, this station was renamed Yuzhno-Sakhalinsk Station.

The station consists of nine 1520 mm gauge tracks, and all tracks are non-electrified. The first track has a low landing platform with a train station built in the 1980s.

In 2018, the railway was regauge into Russian gauge and it was completed in August 2019.

== Destinations ==
Federal Subject(s)	Destinations	Ref.
Sakhalin	Nogliki, Dalnee, Korsakov, Tomari, Poronaysk, Smirnykh, Makarov, Tymovskoye, Kholmsk	

== Nearby landmarks ==
Major landmarks near the station include Children's Railway Sakhalin, Sakhalin Railway management, Yuzhno-Sakhalinsk freight depot, and Lenin Square.
