= Orlovo =

Orlovo Орлово
- Selo
- Location within Altai Krai Location within Russia
- Coordinates: 53°19′N 79°14′E
- Country: Russia
- Region: Altai Krai
- District: Nemetsky National District
- Time zone: UTC+7:00

Orlovo (Russian: Орлово) is a rural locality (a selo) in Nemetsky National District, Altai Krai, Russia. The population was 1,439 as of 2013. There are 6 streets.

== Geography ==
Orlovo is located 21 km northeast of Galbshtadt (the district's administrative centre) by road. Dvorskoye and Alexandrovka are the nearest rural localities.
