= Chihaku ferry =

Chihaku ferry 稚泊連絡船（稚泊航路）
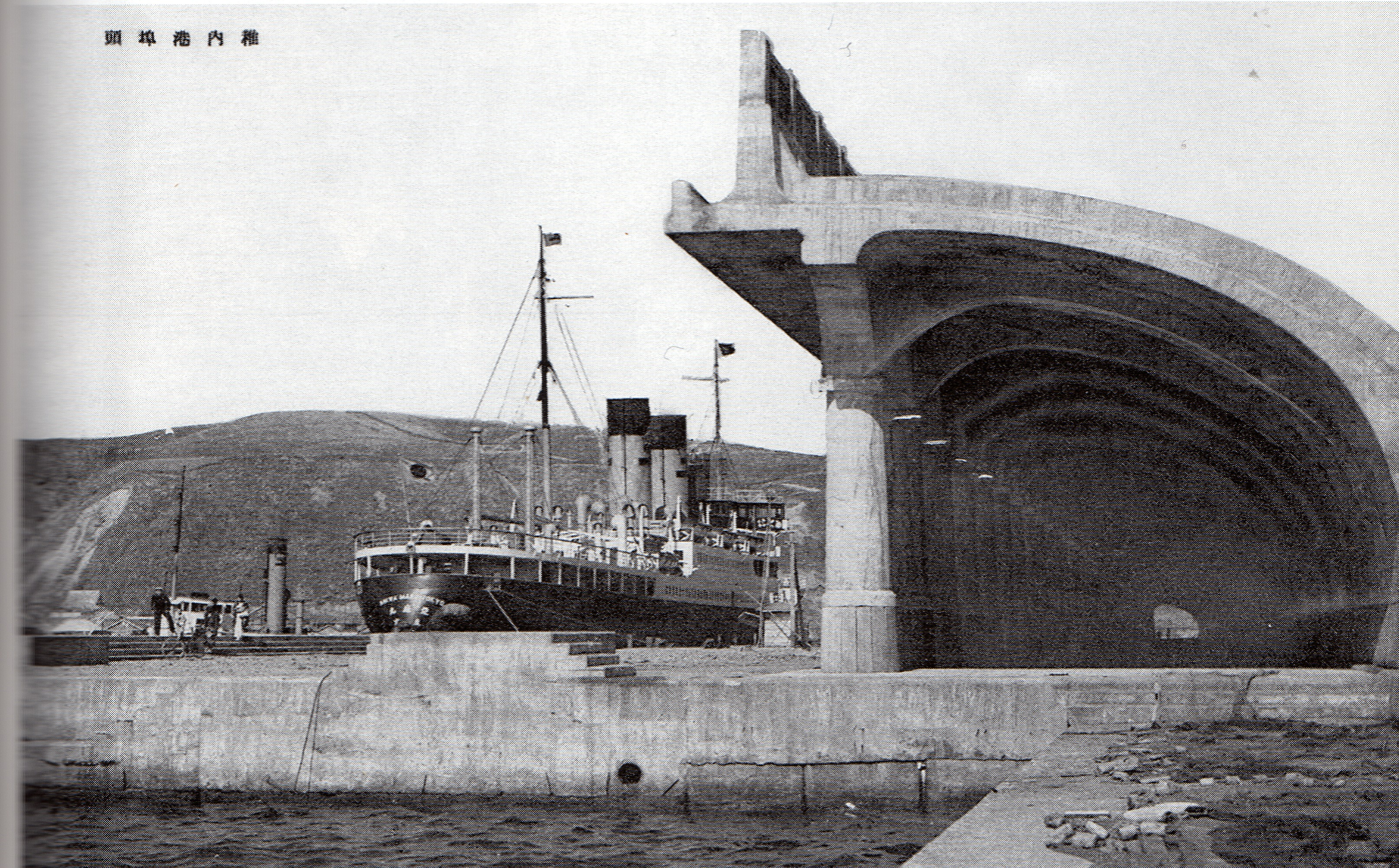
- Aniwa Maru at the North Breakwater Dome
- Locale: Hokkaido, Karafuto
- Waterway: Sōya Straits
- Route: Wakkanai–Ōdomari
- Began operation: 1 May 1923
- Ended operation: 24 August 1945 (18:00)
- Travel time: 9 hours

The Chihaku ferry (稚泊連絡船, Chihaku renrakusen) or (稚泊航路 Chihaku kōro) was a ferry service in operation from 1923 to 1945 between Wakkanai in north Hokkaidō, Japan and Ōdomari, now Korsakov, in what was then Karafuto Prefecture, South Sakhalin. In November 1922, the Ministry of Railways extended the Sōya Main Line to Wakkanai Station (today's Minami-Wakkanai Station). The following May, at the behest of public and private enterprise in Hokkaidō and Karafuto, the Chihaku railway connection ferry service began operations. By the time the service was abandoned in the final days of the war in August 1945, it had ferried 2,840,000 passengers. In November 1970, a monument was erected near the North Breakwater Dome in Wakkanai in its honour. Vessels on the route included the icebreakers Aniwa Maru (亜庭丸), named after Aniva Bay, from 1927, and Sōya Maru (宗谷丸), named after the Sōya Straits, from 1932.
