= Yuzhno-Sakhalinsk =

Yuzhno-Sakhalinsk Южно-Сахалинск
- City
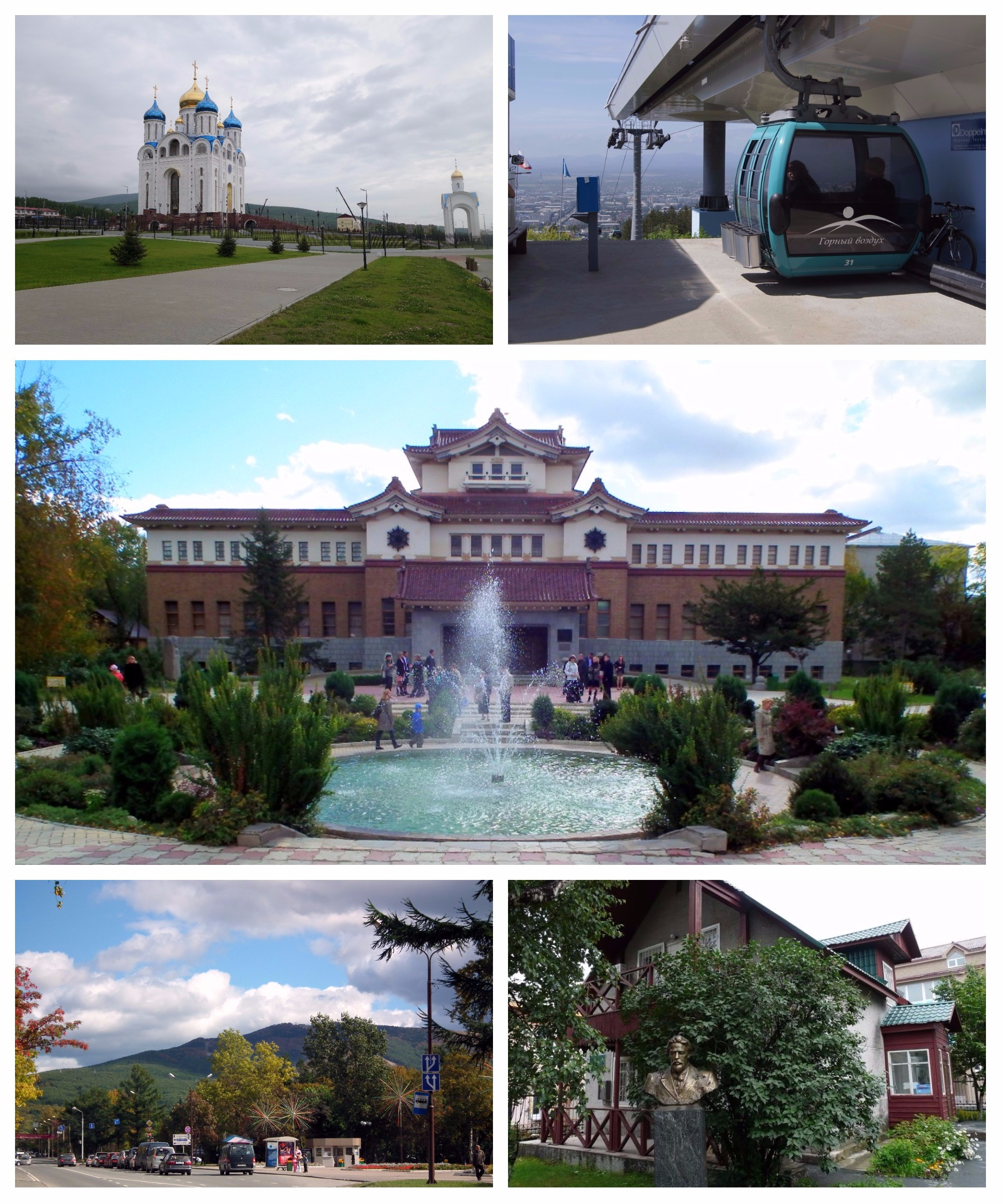
- Top: Cathedral of the Nativity of Christ, Gorny Vozduh Resort Cablecar; Center: Sakhalin Regional Museum; Bottom: Yuzhino-Sakhalinsk Gagarin Park, Anton Chekhov Museum and monument (all of item from left to right)

- Flag Coat of arms
- Interactive map of Yuzhno-Sakhalinsk
- Location of Yuzhno-Sakhalinsk Yuzhno-Sakhalinsk (Sakhalin Oblast)
- Coordinates: 46°58′N 142°44′E
- Country: Russia
- Federal subject: Sakhalin Oblast
- Founded: 1882
- City status since: 1905

Government
  - Head: Sergey Nadsadin

Area
  - Total: 164.7 km^{2} (63.6 sq mi)
- Elevation: 50 m (160 ft)

Population (2010 Census)
  - Total: 181,728
  - Estimate (2025): 181,976 (+0.1%)
  - Rank: 99th in 2010
  - Density: 1,103/km^{2} (2,858/sq mi)

Administrative status
  - Subordinated to: city of oblast significance of Yuzhno-Sakhalinsk
  - Capital of: Sakhalin Oblast, city of oblast significance of Yuzhno-Sakhalinsk

Municipal status
  - Urban okrug: Yuzhno-Sakhalinsk Urban Okrug
  - Capital of: Yuzhno-Sakhalinsk Urban Okrug
- Time zone: UTC+11 (MSK+8)
- Postal code: 693000
- Dialing codes: +7 4242; +7 424
- OKTMO ID: 64701000001
- Website: www.yuzhno-sakh.ru

Yuzhno-Sakhalinsk (Russian: Ю́жно-Сахали́нск, IPA: [ˈjuʐnə səxɐˈlʲinsk], lit. 'South Sakhalin City') is a city and the administrative center of Sakhalin Oblast, Russia. It is located on the island of Sakhalin in the Russian Far East, north of Japan. Population: 181,587 (2021 census).

The city was called Vladimirovka (Влади́мировка) from 1882 to 1905, then Toyohara (Japanese: 豊原市, Hepburn: Toyohara-shi) under Imperial Japanese control from 1905 to 1946. Gas and oil extraction as well as processing are amongst the main industries on the island.

== History ==
Yuzhno-Sakhalinsk began as a small Russian settlement called Vladimirovka, founded by convicts in 1882. The Treaty of Portsmouth in 1905, which brought an end to the Russo-Japanese War of 1904–1905, awarded the southern half of the island of Sakhalin to Japan. Vladimirovka was renamed Toyohara (lit. 'bountiful plain'), and was the prefectoral capital of the Japanese Karafuto Prefecture.

During the Soviet–Japanese War within World War II, the city was recaptured by Soviet troops. Ownership of the city was transferred to the Soviet Union and it was renamed Yuzhno-Sakhalinsk. Town status was granted to it in 1946.

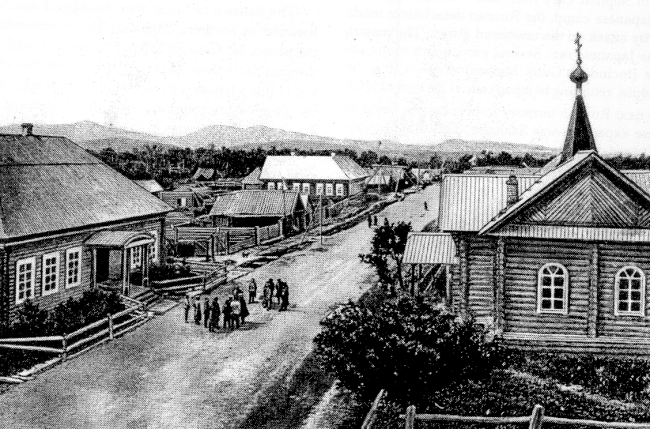
Early days of Vladimirovka

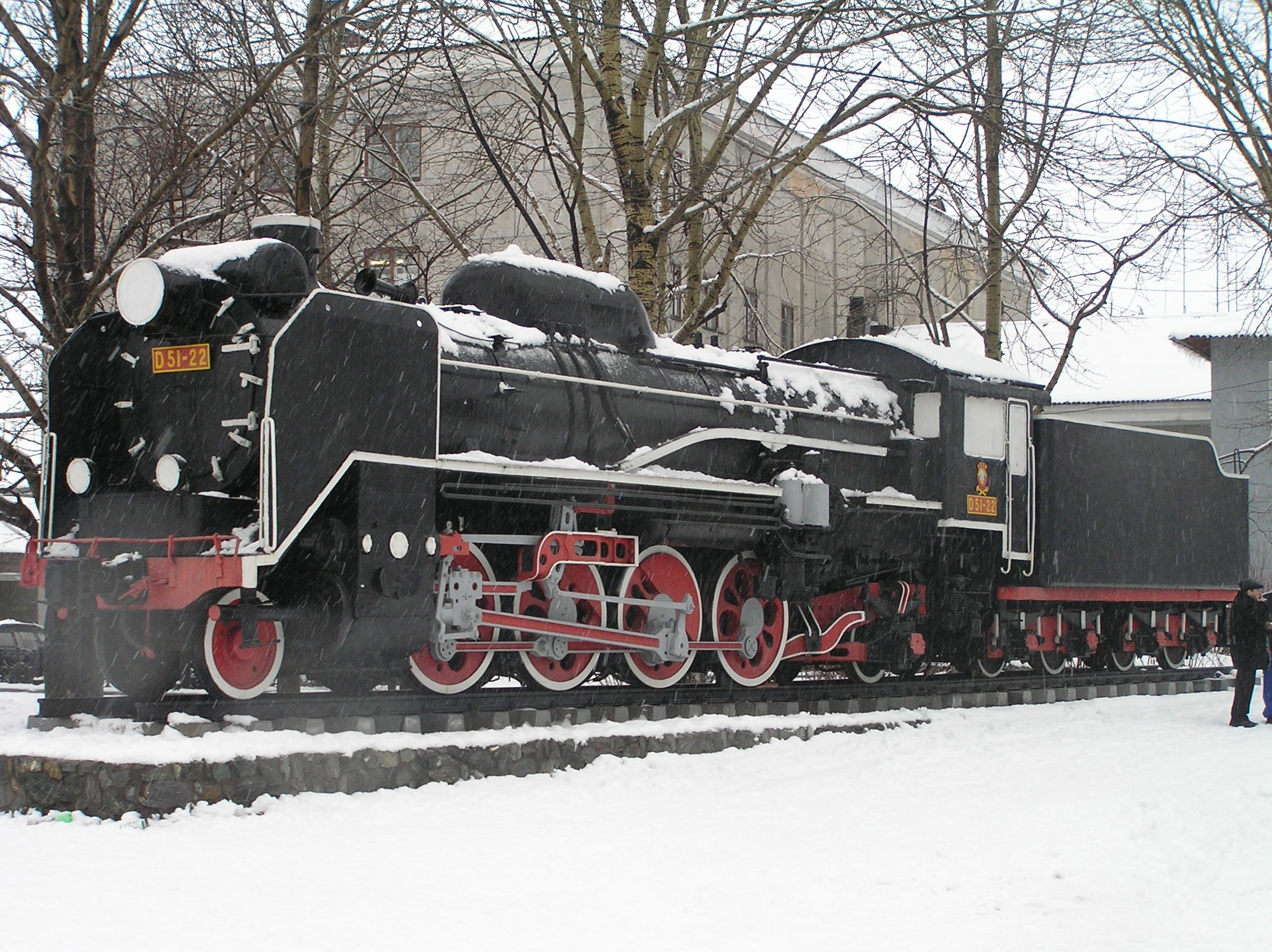
This Japanese D51 steam locomotive stands outside the Yuzhno-Sakhalinsk Railway Station

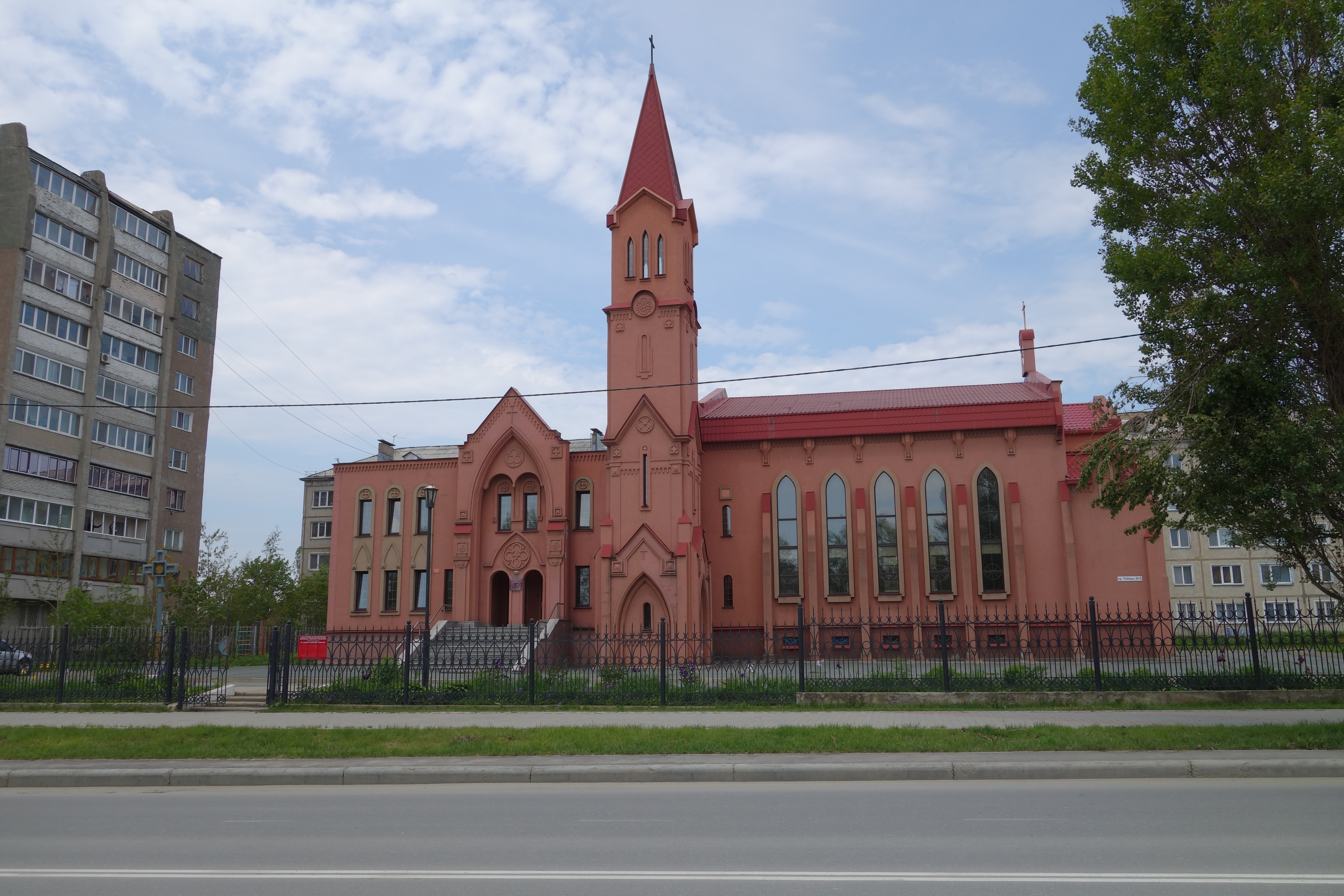
Catholic church in Yuzhno-Sakhalinsk

== Administrative and municipal status ==
Administrative borders of the Yuzhno-Sakhalinsk District within Sakhalin Oblast

Yuzhno-Sakhalinsk is the administrative center of the oblast. Within the framework of administrative divisions, it is, together with ten rural localities, incorporated as the city of oblast significance of Yuzhno-Sakhalinsk, an administrative unit with the status equal to that of the districts. As a municipal division, the city of oblast significance of Yuzhno-Sakhalinsk is incorporated as Yuzhno-Sakhalinsk Urban Okrug.

== Economy and infrastructure ==
Due to significant investment from oil companies like ExxonMobil and Shell, Yuzhno-Sakhalinsk has experienced substantial economic growth. Although this growth has primarily occurred in the northern part of the island, both companies maintain headquarters and residential complexes in the city of Yuzhno-Sakhalinsk itself. The demand for natural resources by the Japanese, Chinese, and South Koreans has ensured continued prosperity in the foreseeable future for the entire island.

There has been significant criticism, including from Presidential Envoy Kamil Iskhakov, that Sakhalin is not caring for its citizens. Despite sizable gas deposits and incoming investments from gas companies, the regional administration does not yet have plans for the installation of gas services on the island. However, several improvements in the city have been made and it continues to grow in various aspects every year.

One of the very few remaining Japanese buildings in Yuzhno-Sakhalinsk now functions as the local museum. The building was designed in the Emperor's Crown Style by Japanese architect Yoshio Kaizuka, and completed in 1937.

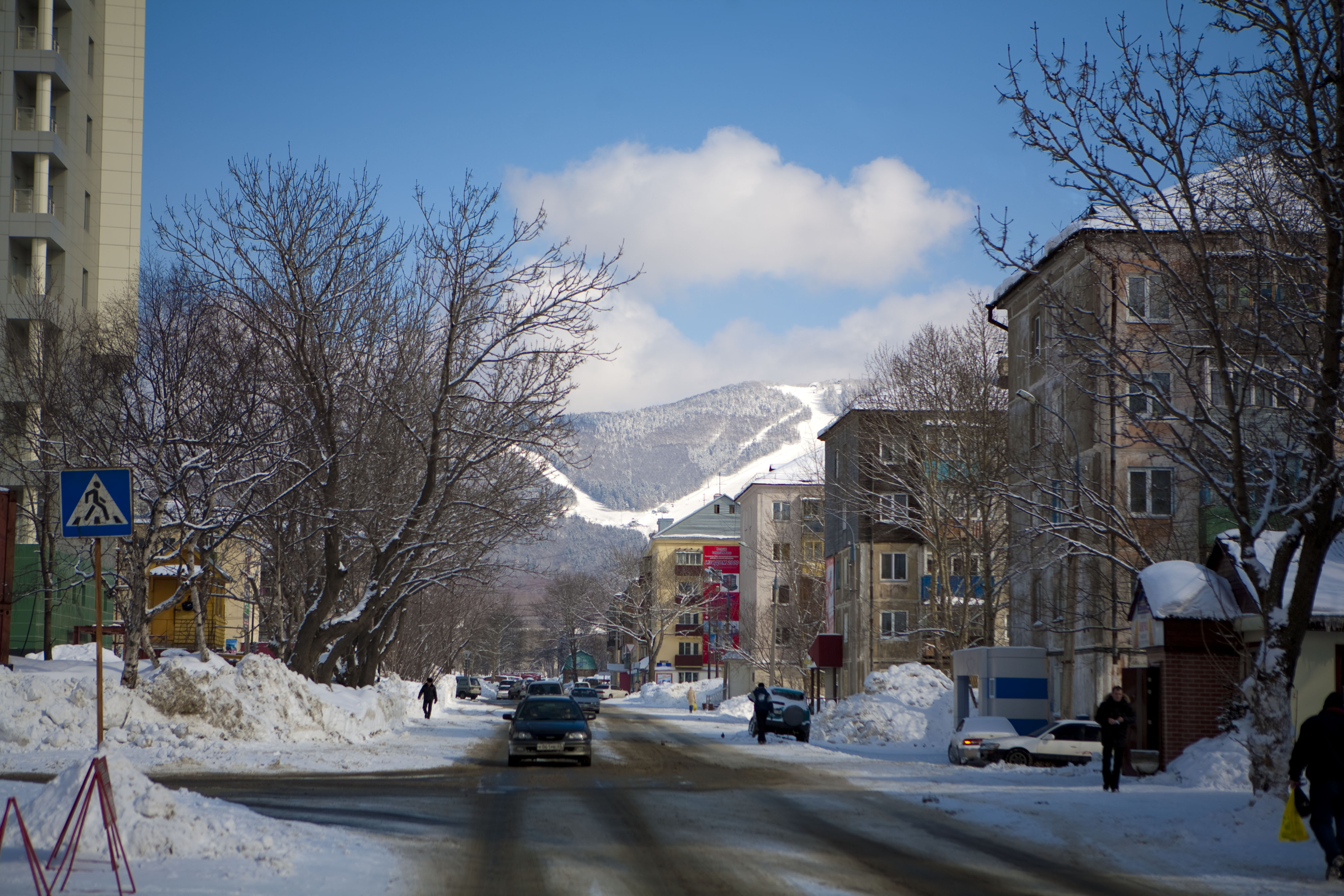
Central part of Yuzhno-Sakhalinsk

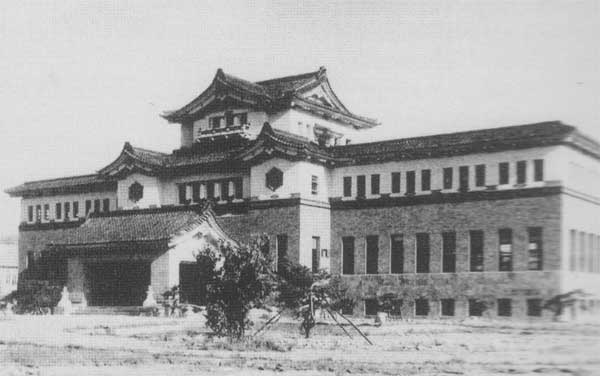
Yuzhno-Sakhalinsk museum during Japanese rule

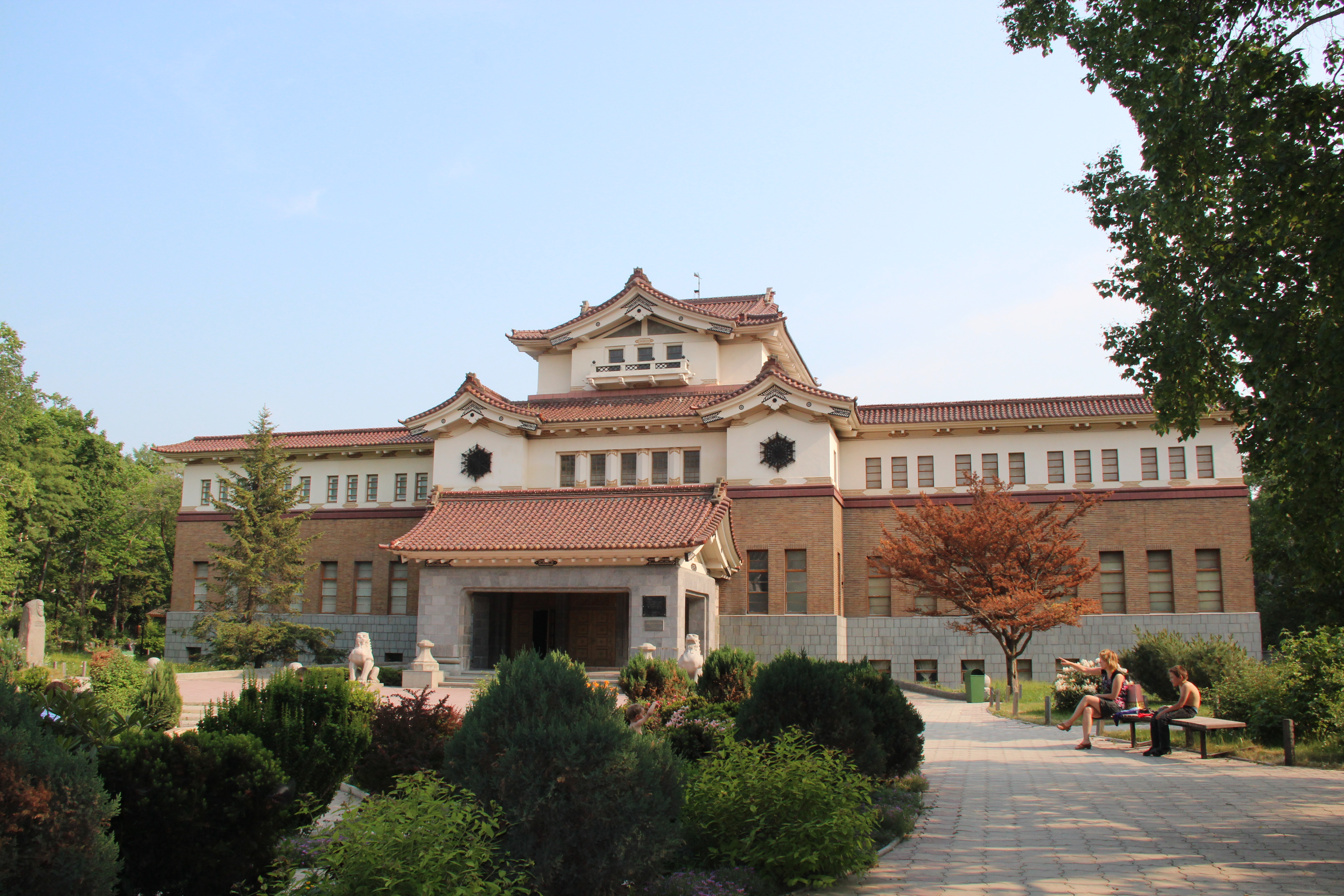
Yuzhno-Sakhalinsk museum in 2012

=== Transportation ===
The city hosts the head office of Aurora Airline, subsidiary of Aeroflot. It is served by the Yuzhno-Sakhalinsk Airport. The city is also the hub for the island's narrow gauge railway network that underwent conversion to Russian broad gauge in August 2019. In addition to railways, the town is also a hub for roadways, such as the A-391 (which travels south to Korsakov) and the A-392 (which travels west to Kholmsk).

Due to restrictions, foreigners wishing to leave Yuzhno-Sakhalinsk in order to travel to any other part of the Sakhalin Oblast and its internal and territorial waters are required to seek permission from the Federal Security Service (FSB) and the Border Guard. Scuba diving and recreating on the seacoast is permitted only in places defined by the Border Guard.

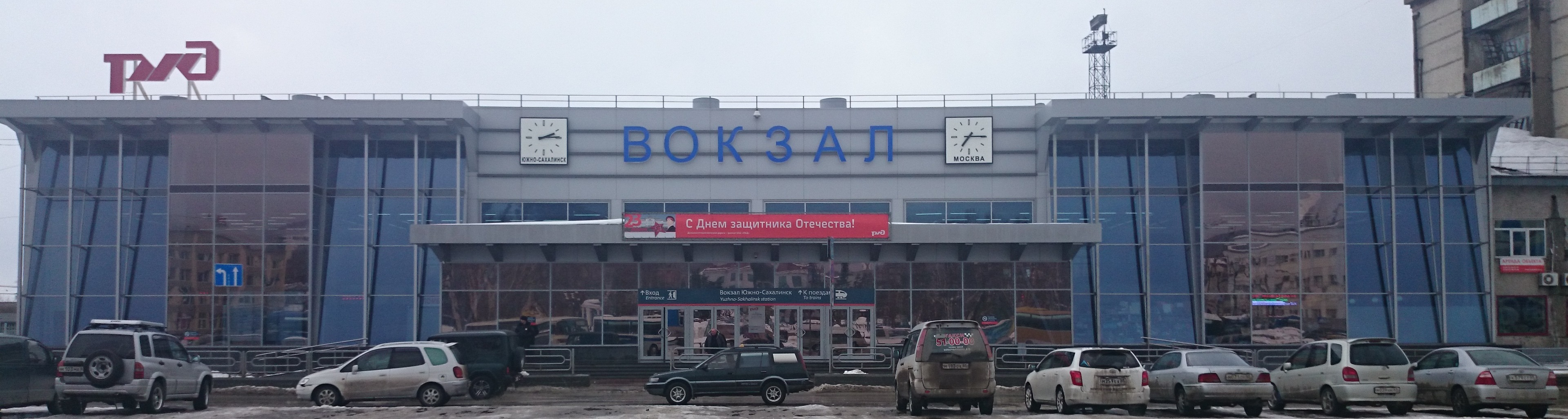
Yuzhno-Sakhalinsk Railway Station

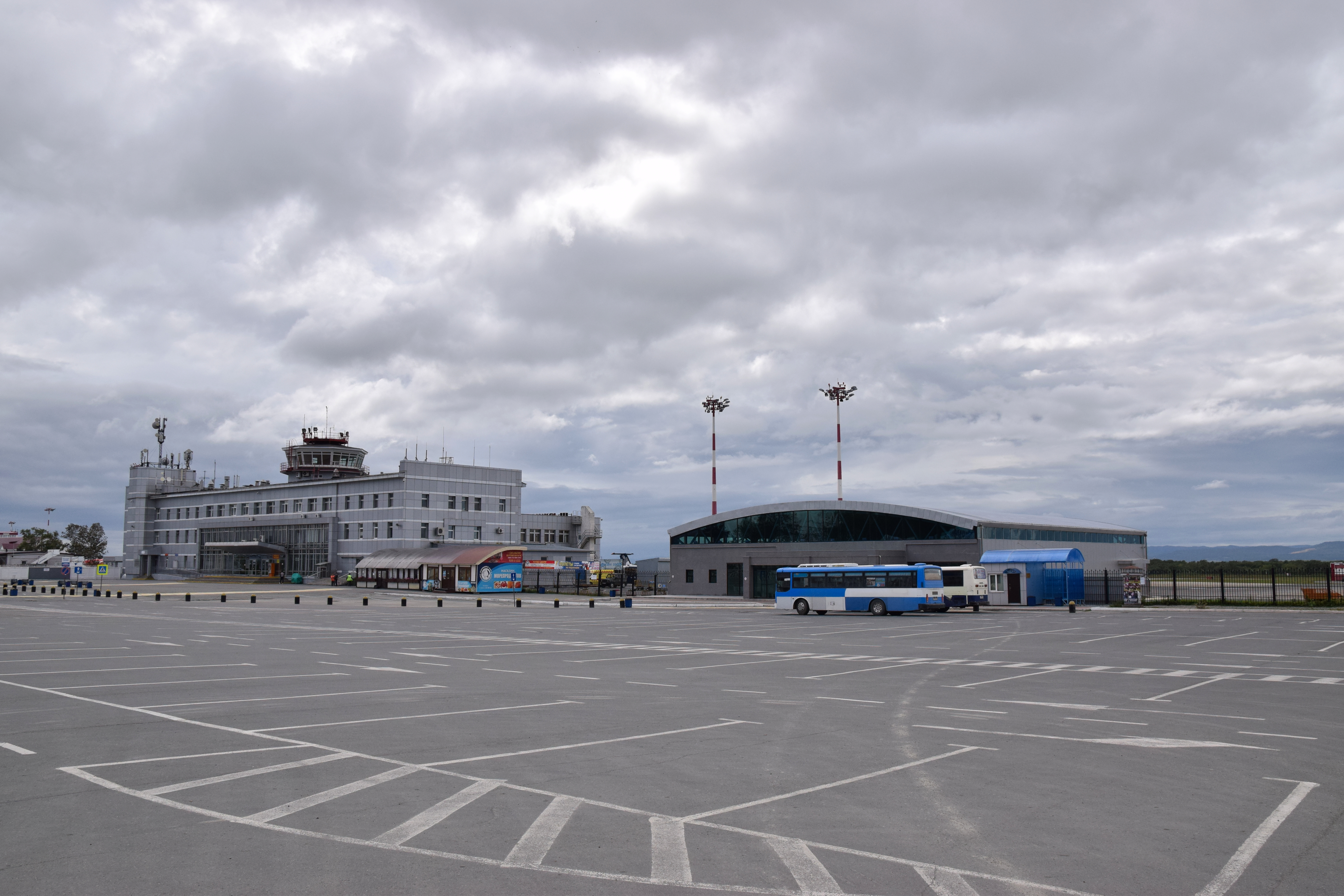
Yuzhno-Sakhalinsk Airport

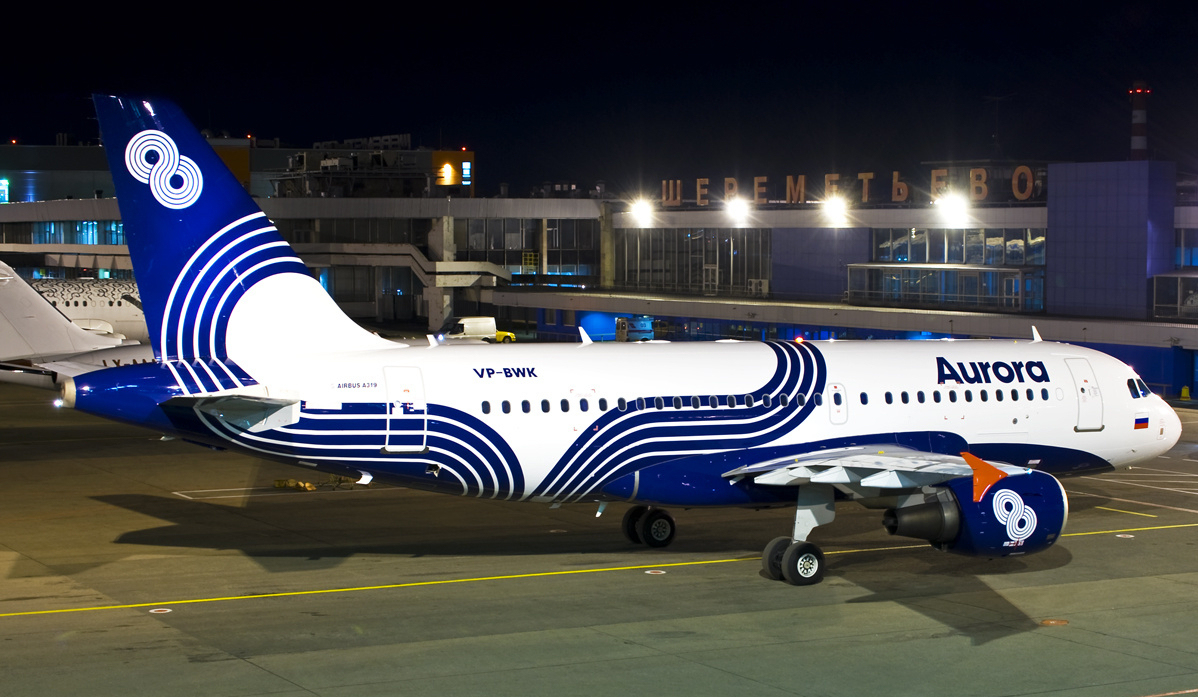
Airbus A319 of Aurora Airline

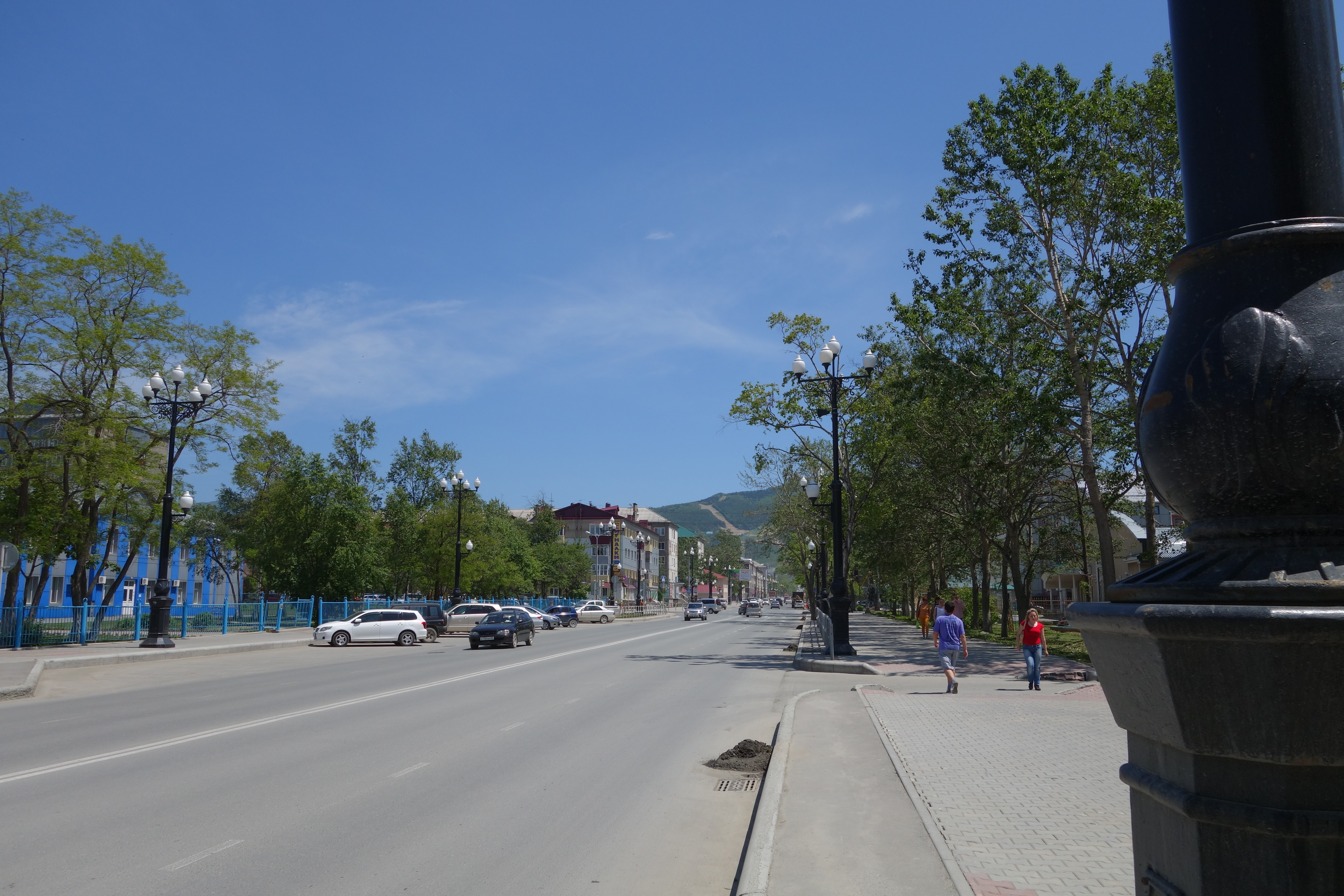
Toyohara Avenue

== Education ==
Institutes of elementary and middle education included Sakhalin International School until its closure in March 2022.

Institutes of higher education in the city include Sakhalin State University and Yuzhno-Sakhalinsk Institute of Economics, Law and Informatics. There are also some branches of other universities:

- Yuzhno-Sakhalinsk institute (branch) of Russian State trade-economics university
- Branch of Far East State university of railways
- Branch of Modern Academy of the humanities
- Branch of The Pacific State economics university
- Branch of Russian economics academy named after G.V. Plekhanov
- Branch of Far East law institute

== Sport ==
There exist numerous sport venues and clubs in Sakhalin. FC Sakhalin Yuzhno-Sakhalinsk, PSK Sakhalin, Vostok-65, Sakhalin Sharks, Sakhalin for football, hockey, basketball, youth hockey and volleyball respectively. Mount Bolshevik provides the Gorny Vozdukh ("Mountain Air") ski resort which is qualified for international competitions.

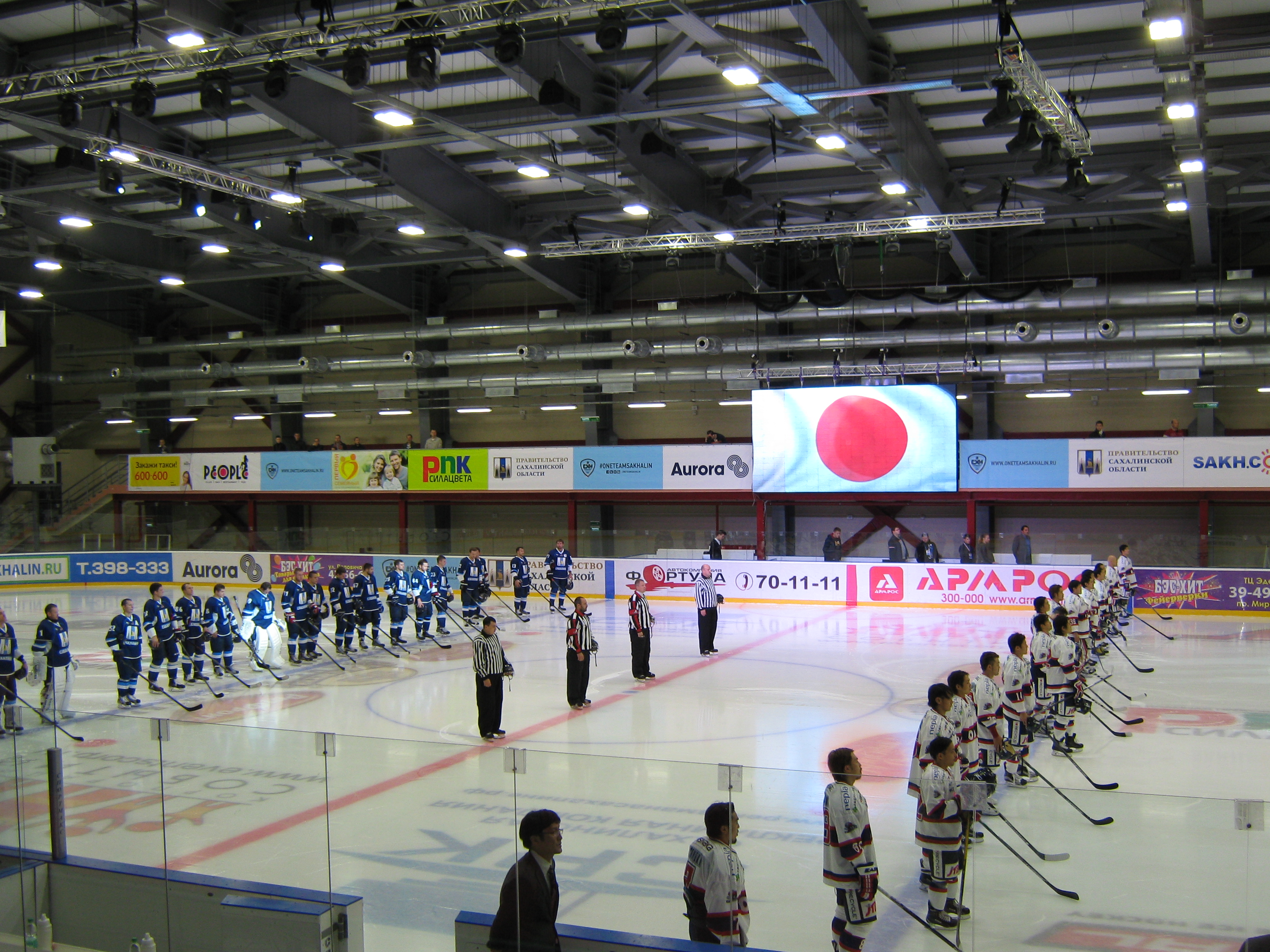
PSK Sakhalin players in Crystal Ice Palace

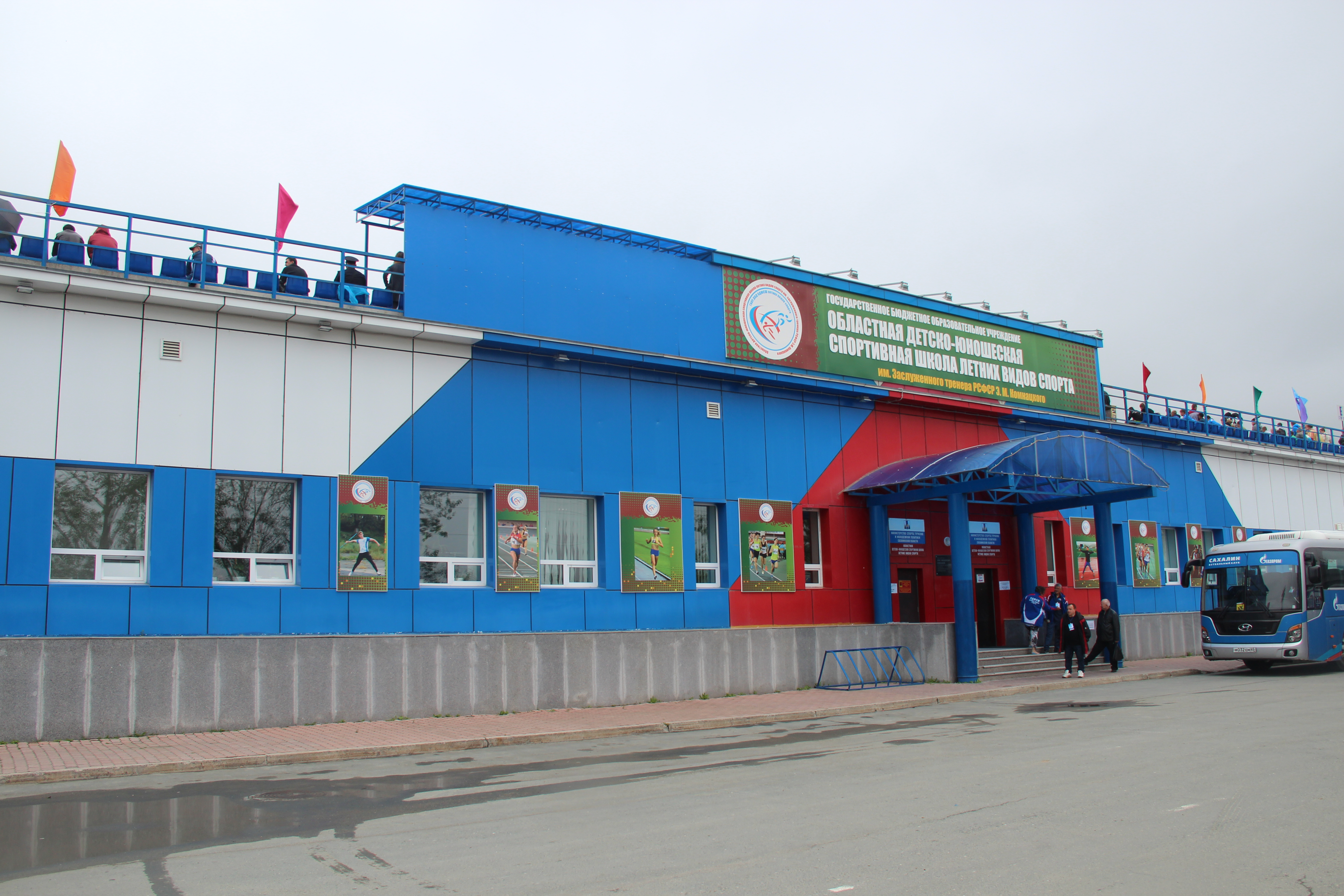
Spartak Stadium of FC Sakhalin Yuzhno-Sakhalinsk

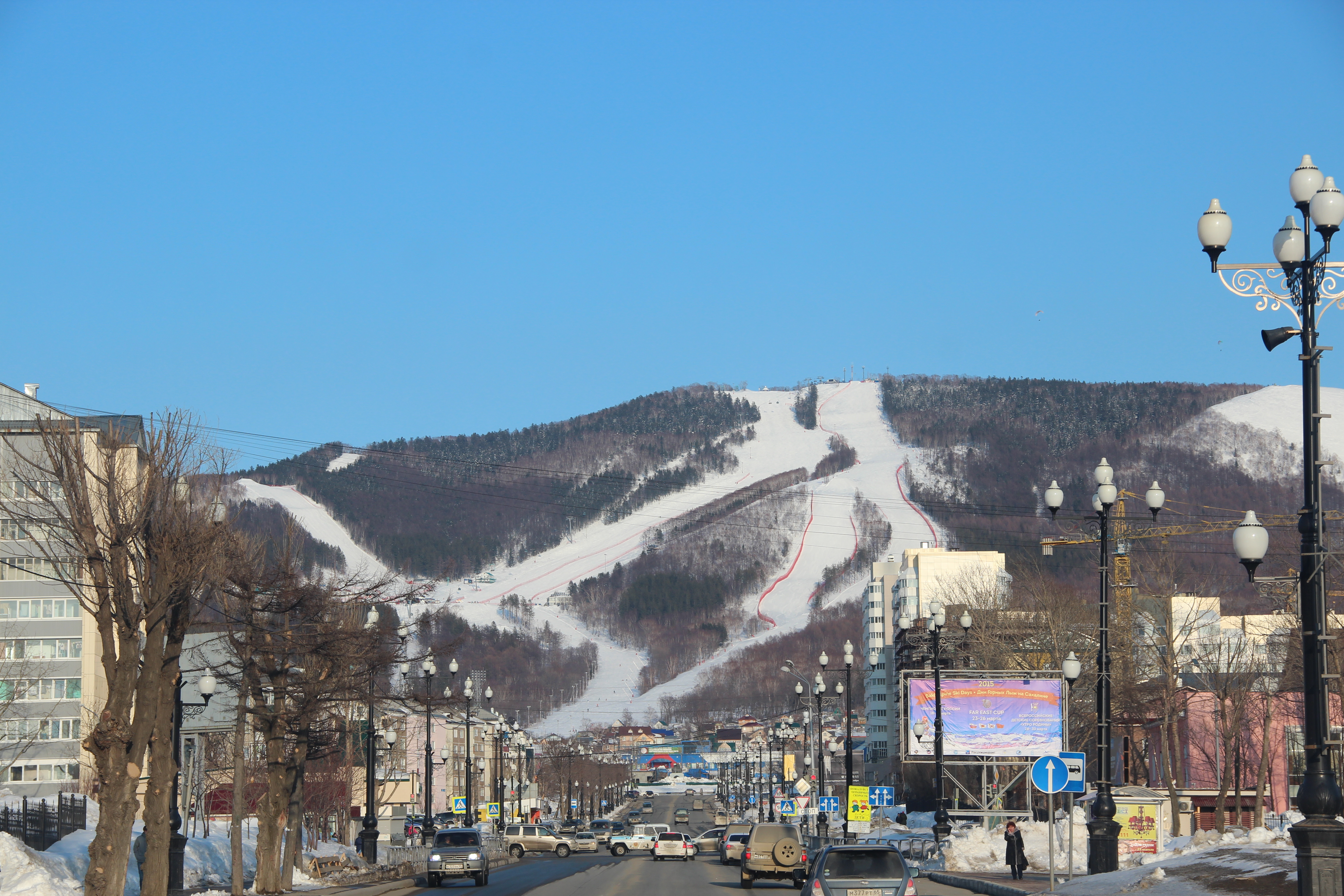
Gorny Vozdukh ski resort

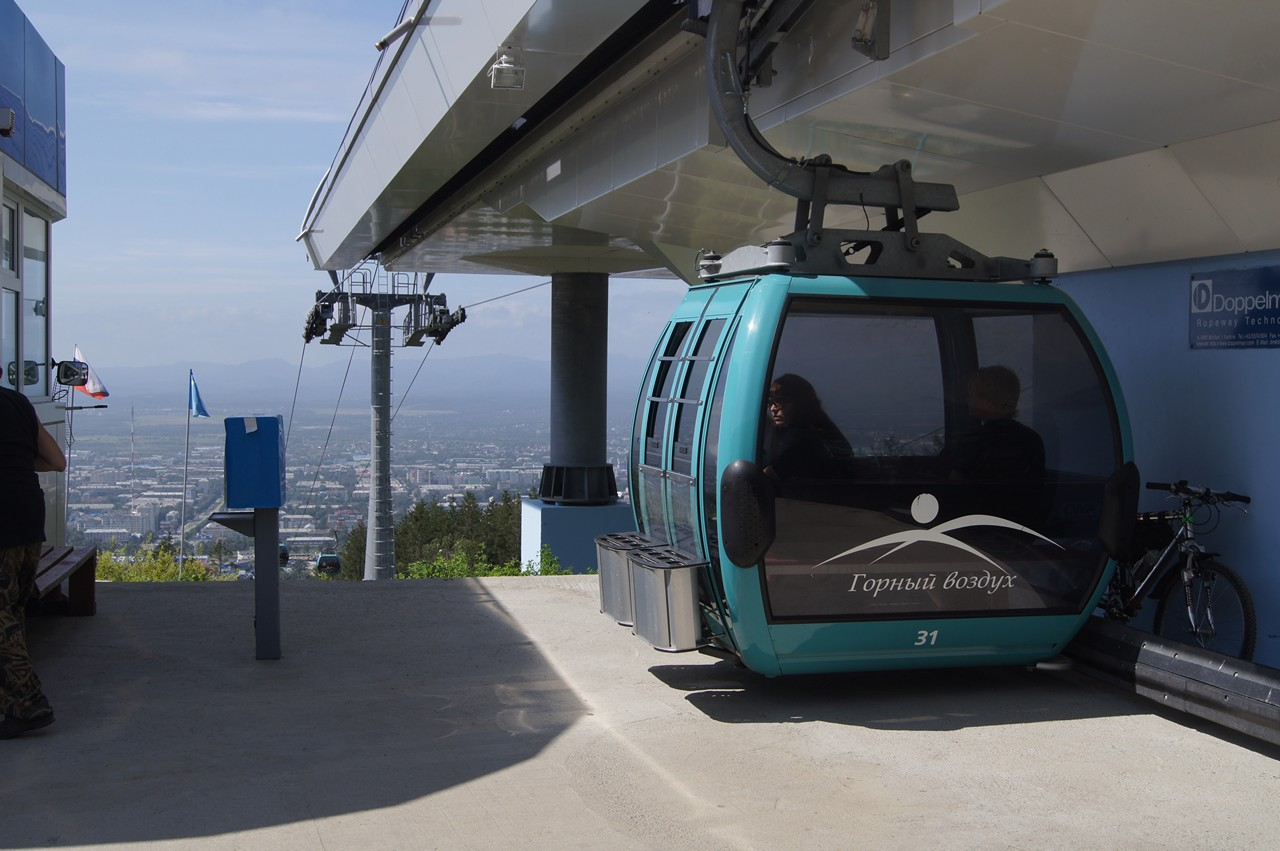
Ski lifts of Gorny Vozdukh ski resort

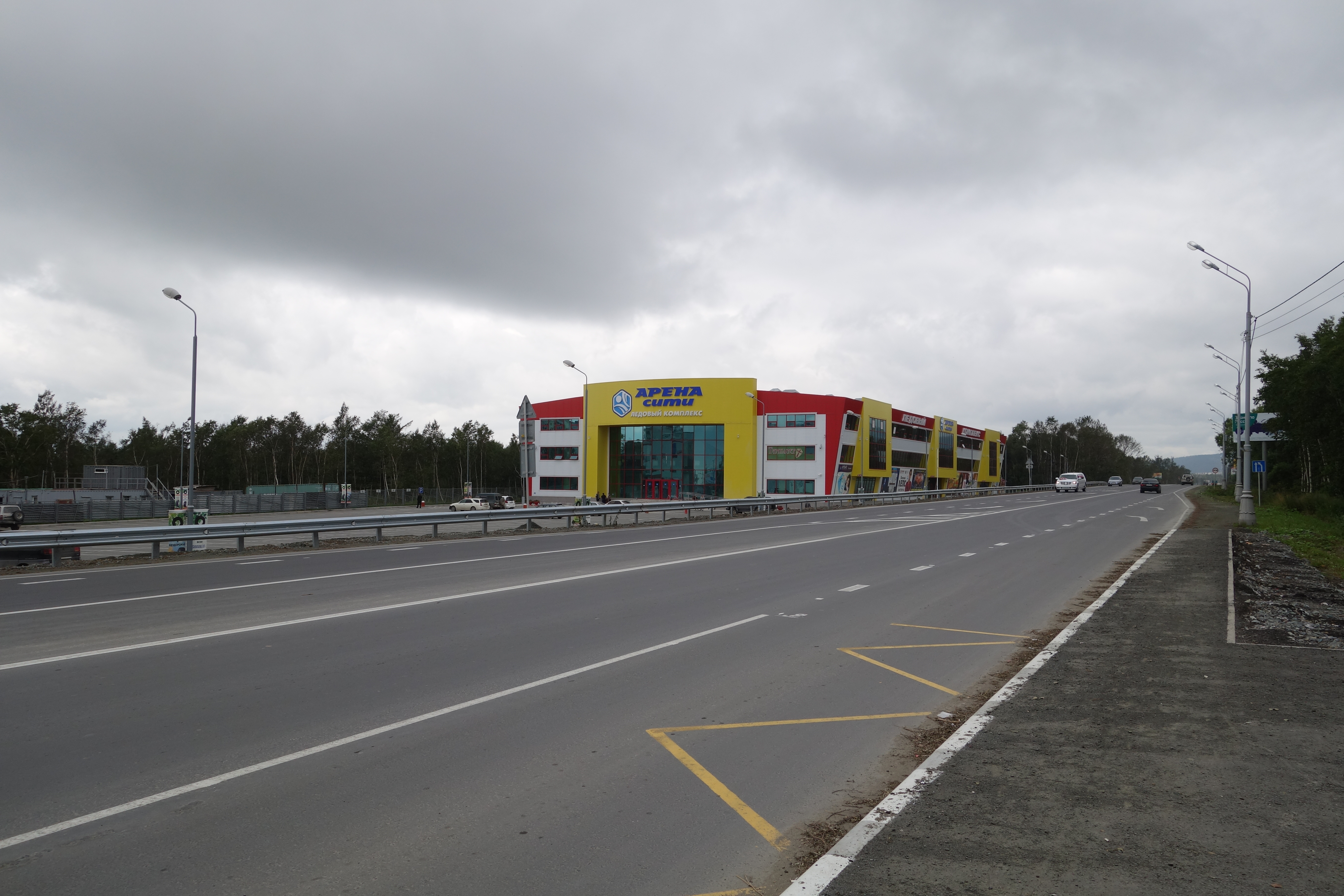
Arena City Ice Palace

== Media ==
=== Television ===
- 3 – 1TV Russia
- 5 – Rossiya-24 (Russia-24)
- 10- Rossiya-1 (Russia-1)
- 12 – ASTV (Alternative Sakhalin Television)
- 21 – The first multiplex digital TV DVB T2
- 23 – Che
- 27 – Domashny / OTV (Sakhalin Regional Television)
- 30 – NTV Russia
- 33 – STS
- 35 – Ren-TV / Echo of Sakhalin
- 43 – Match TV Russia (ex. Russia-2)
- 46 – Petersburg–Channel 5
- 49 – Rossiya-K (Russia-K)
- 51 – The second multiplex of digital TV DVB T2

=== Radio ===
- 87,9 Autoradio (plan)
- 88,3 Retro FM
- 88,9 Radio Record
- 89,9 Russian Radio
- 101,7 Radio Chanson
- 102,5 Europa Plus
- 102,9 Humor FM
- 103,5 Mayak
- 104,4 Love Radio
- 105,1 Radio Dacha (plan)
- 105,5 Radio ASTV
- 106,0 Radio Rossii
- 106,5 Dorognoe Radio
- 107,2 Vesti FM

== Demographics ==
Historical population
| Year | Pop. | ±% |
|---|---|---|
| 1959 | 85,510 | — |
| 1970 | 105,840 | +23.8% |
| 1979 | 139,861 | +32.1% |
| 1989 | 159,299 | +13.9% |
| 2002 | 175,085 | +9.9% |
| 2010 | 181,728 | +3.8% |
| 2021 | 181,587 | −0.1% |
Source: Census data

=== Population ===
Most residents are ethnic Russians, but there also exists a sizable population of Korean Russians. Of the 43,000 Sakhalin Koreans, half are estimated to live in Yuzhno-Sakhalinsk, comprising roughly 12% of the city's population. A smaller number of indigenous minorities, such as Ainu, Nivkhs and Oroks can be found.

=== Religion ===
The majority of the population are Russian Orthodox.

== Geography ==
The city is located on the Susuya River. It is the largest city on the island, and the only one with more than 100,000 inhabitants. The straight-line distance to Moscow is 6,660 kilometers (4,140 mi).

=== Climate ===
The climate is humid continental (Köppen Dfb) with mild summers and cold winters. Maritime influences can be seen in that precipitation is much higher than in interior Russia and that summers are distinctly cooler than in Khabarovsk or Irkutsk, while winters are much milder. Summers are frequently foggy, reducing the amount of sunshine. Considering its southerly maritime position winters are very cold, albeit warmer than expected for surrounding inland areas affected by the Siberian High. Snowfall is more frequent than in those areas, due to said maritime influence bringing moisture to the coastline. Yuzhno-Sakhalinsk is relatively sunny compared to Hokkaido locations, but gloomy by the lower latitudes of the Russian Far East's standards.

Climate data for Yuzhno-Sakhalinsk (1991–2020, extremes 1942–present)
| Month | Jan | Feb | Mar | Apr | May | Jun | Jul | Aug | Sep | Oct | Nov | Dec | Year |
|---|---|---|---|---|---|---|---|---|---|---|---|---|---|
| Record high °C (°F) | 4.3 (39.7) | 7.1 (44.8) | 13.0 (55.4) | 22.9 (73.2) | 29.6 (85.3) | 30.8 (87.4) | 34.4 (93.9) | 34.7 (94.5) | 29.0 (84.2) | 23.5 (74.3) | 18.1 (64.6) | 9.0 (48.2) | 34.7 (94.5) |
| Mean maximum °C (°F) | 0.8 (33.4) | 2.8 (37.0) | 6.8 (44.2) | 16.0 (60.8) | 23.7 (74.7) | 26.3 (79.3) | 28.0 (82.4) | 28.9 (84.0) | 25.9 (78.6) | 19.7 (67.5) | 12.4 (54.3) | 3.9 (39.0) | 29.8 (85.6) |
| Mean daily maximum °C (°F) | −6.0 (21.2) | −4.8 (23.4) | 0.2 (32.4) | 6.9 (44.4) | 13.8 (56.8) | 17.7 (63.9) | 21.0 (69.8) | 22.3 (72.1) | 19.4 (66.9) | 12.5 (54.5) | 3.5 (38.3) | −3.5 (25.7) | 8.6 (47.5) |
| Daily mean °C (°F) | −11.5 (11.3) | −11.2 (11.8) | −5.2 (22.6) | 1.7 (35.1) | 7.5 (45.5) | 11.9 (53.4) | 15.9 (60.6) | 17.3 (63.1) | 13.5 (56.3) | 6.7 (44.1) | −1.2 (29.8) | −8.5 (16.7) | 3.1 (37.6) |
| Mean daily minimum °C (°F) | −16.6 (2.1) | −17.2 (1.0) | −10.4 (13.3) | −2.6 (27.3) | 2.7 (36.9) | 7.7 (45.9) | 12.3 (54.1) | 13.5 (56.3) | 8.7 (47.7) | 1.8 (35.2) | −5.2 (22.6) | −13.2 (8.2) | −1.5 (29.3) |
| Mean minimum °C (°F) | −27.3 (−17.1) | −27.3 (−17.1) | −22.2 (−8.0) | −10.4 (13.3) | −2.6 (27.3) | 1.7 (35.1) | 6.6 (43.9) | 6.8 (44.2) | 0.6 (33.1) | −5.3 (22.5) | −14.8 (5.4) | −22.5 (−8.5) | −28.5 (−19.3) |
| Record low °C (°F) | −36.2 (−33.2) | −34.8 (−30.6) | −30.5 (−22.9) | −19.5 (−3.1) | −6.2 (20.8) | −2.1 (28.2) | 1.3 (34.3) | 3.6 (38.5) | −4.2 (24.4) | −11.8 (10.8) | −25.7 (−14.3) | −33.5 (−28.3) | −36.2 (−33.2) |
| Average precipitation mm (inches) | 56 (2.2) | 38 (1.5) | 52 (2.0) | 57 (2.2) | 66 (2.6) | 64 (2.5) | 92 (3.6) | 107 (4.2) | 102 (4.0) | 102 (4.0) | 75 (3.0) | 71 (2.8) | 882 (34.7) |
| Average rainy days | 0 | 0 | 2 | 10 | 17 | 17 | 20 | 19 | 19 | 19 | 9 | 2 | 135 |
| Average snowy days | 25 | 24 | 24 | 13 | 3 | 0 | 0 | 0 | 0 | 4 | 20 | 27 | 140 |
| Average relative humidity (%) | 81 | 79 | 76 | 75 | 76 | 83 | 85 | 86 | 83 | 79 | 80 | 82 | 80 |
| Average dew point °C (°F) | −15 (5) | −14 (7) | −9 (16) | −2 (28) | 3 (37) | 9 (48) | 13 (55) | 15 (59) | 10 (50) | 3 (37) | −4 (25) | −11 (12) | 0 (32) |
| Mean monthly sunshine hours | 133.3 | 155.9 | 190.6 | 197.1 | 208.0 | 186.5 | 164.0 | 165.1 | 188.8 | 167.4 | 116.3 | 112.4 | 1,985.4 |
Source 1: Pogoda.ru.net
Source 2: NOAA, Time and Date (dewpoints 1985–2015), Infoclimat

== Notable people ==
- Natalya Pechonkina (maiden name Burda, later Chistyakova); born July 15, 1946, Yuzhno-Sakhalinsk) is a Soviet athlete. She competed for the USSR in the 1968 Summer Olympics held in Mexico City in the 400 metres where she won the bronze medal.
- Alexander Godunov; born November 28, 1949, died May 18, 1995, was a Russian-American ballet dancer and film actor.

== Twin towns and sister cities ==
Yuzhno-Sakhalinsk is twinned with:

- Asahikawa, Japan
- Hakodate, Japan
- Wakkanai, Japan
- Yanji, China
- Ansan, South Korea
