= List of earthquakes in 1995 =

Earthquakes in 1995
Approximate epicenters of notable earthquakes in 1995
- 4.0–5.9 magnitude
- 6.0–6.9 magnitude
- 7.0–7.9 magnitude
- 8.0+ magnitude
- Strongest: 8.0 M_{w} Mexico; Chile
- Deadliest: 6.9 M_{w} (Japan) Japan; 6,433 deaths
- Total fatalities: 8,911

Number by magnitude
- 9.0+: 0

This is a list of earthquakes in 1995. Only earthquakes of magnitude 6 or above are included, unless they result in damage or casualties, or are notable for some other reason. All dates are listed according to UTC time.

== By death toll ==
Rank	Death toll	Magnitude	Location	MMI	Depth (km)	Date
1	6,433	6.9	Japan, Hyōgo	XI (Extreme)	21.9	January 16
2	1,989	7.1	Russia, Sakhalin	IX (Violent)	11.0	May 27
3	101	6.2	Turkey, Afyon	VIII (Severe)	33.0	October 1
4	84	6.8	Indonesia, Jambi	VIII (Severe)	29.8	October 7
5	81	6.2	China, Sichuan	VI (Strong)	10.0	October 23
6	49	8.0	Mexico, Colima	VIII (Severe)	40.0	October 9
7	42	6.4	Colombia, Chocó	V (Moderate)	73.5	February 8
8	28	6.5	Greece, Central Greece	VIII (Severe)	14.2	June 15
9	14	5.6	China, Gansu	VI (Strong)	12.8	July 21
10	11	6.9	East Timor offshore	VIII (Severe)	11.2	May 14
10	11	6.8	Myanmar, Shan	VII (Very strong)	12.5	July 11
12	10	7.2	Egypt, South Sinai offshore	VIII (Severe)	18.0	November 22

== By magnitude ==
Rank	Magnitude	Death toll	Location	MMI	Depth (km)	Date
1	8.0	49	Mexico, Colima	VIII (Severe)	40.0	October 9
1	8.0	3	Chile, Antofagasta	VII (Very strong)	46.0	July 30
3	7.9	0	Russia, Kuril Islands offshore	V (Moderate)	33.0	December 3
4	7.7	0	Papua New Guinea, Bougainville offshore	VII (Very strong)	30.1	August 16
4	7.7	0	New Caledonia, Loyalty Islands offshore	III (Weak)	20.2	May 16
6	7.4	3	Mexico, Guerrero	VII (Very strong)	23.0	September 14
6	7.4	0	Tonga, Niuas offshore	V (Moderate)	21.2	April 7
8	7.2	10	Egypt, South Sinai offshore	VIII (Severe)	18.0	November 22
8	7.2	0	Mexico, Chiapas offshore	VI (Strong)	159.3	October 21
8	7.2	0	Papua New Guinea, Bougainville offshore	VII (Very strong)	33.0	August 16
8	7.2	0	New Zealand, Kermadec Islands offshore	VI (Strong)	35.3	July 3
8	7.2	0	Philippines, Eastern Visayas offshore	VII (Very strong)	20.7	April 21
13	7.1	0	Indonesia, Banda Sea offshore	VI (Strong)	141.9	December 25
13	7.1	0	Japan, Kagoshima offshore	VII (Very strong)	28.4	October 18
13	7.1	0	Northern Mariana Islands offshore	I (Not felt)	594.9	August 23
13	7.1	1,989	Russia, Sakhalin	IX (Violent)	11.0	May 27
13	7.1	0	Philippines, Eastern Visayas offshore	VII (Very strong)	16.0	May 5
13	7.1	0	New Zealand, Gisborne offshore	VII (Very strong)	21.1	February 5
19	7.0	3	Ecuador, Morona-Santiago	VIII (Severe)	24.4	October 3
19	7.0	0	Japan, Aomori	VII (Very strong)	26.9	January 6

== By month ==
=== January ===
January
- Strongest: 7.0 M_{w} Japan
- Deadliest: 6.9 M_{w} Japan; 6,434 deaths
- Total fatalities: 6,434

Number by magnitude
- 9.0+: 0
- 8.0–8.9: 0
- 7.0–7.9: 1
- 6.0–6.9: 14

Date	Country and location	M_{w}	Depth (km)	MMI	Notes	Casualties	
Date	Country and location	M_{w}	Depth (km)	MMI	Notes	Dead	Injured
4	Southern East Pacific Rise	6.0	10.0	-	-	-	-
5	Russia, Perm, 7 km southwest of Solikamsk	4.8	10.0	VI	The earthquake severely damaged a mine, and caused subsidence in Solikamsk.	-	-
6	Japan, Iwate offshore, 63 km southeast of Hachinohe	7.0	26.9	VII	At least 29 people were injured in Aomori and Iwate Prefectures and about 5,000 homes lost water services in the region.	-	29
7	Japan, Iwate offshore, 76 km north northeast of Miyako	6.0	32.0	VI	-	-	-
9	Japan, Ibaraki offshore, 48 km east northeast of Hasaki	6.0	33.3	IV	-	-	-
12	Russia, Sakhalin, 38 km northeast of Shikotan	6.0	34.9	-	-	-	-
14	Papua New Guinea, East New Britain, 103 km south southwest of Kokopo	6.0	62.2	V	-	-	-
16	United States, Alaska offshore, Rat Islands, 298 km (185 mi) west southwest of Adak	6.3	33.0	-	-	-	-
16	Japan, Kobe, 8 km south of Akashi	6.9	17.9	XI	The Great Hanshin Earthquake caused severe and widespread damage, particularly in Kobe. Nearly 400,000 buildings and other infrastructures were damaged beyond repair and many collapsed while fires were triggered which raged in different areas. The quake claimed the lives of 6,434 people while another 43,792 were injured and another 310,000 displaced. Total damage was an estimated $200 billion (USD). It is the deadliest earthquake of 1995 and one of the costliest natural disasters.	6,434	43,792
17	Fiji Region	6.3	633.5	-	-	-	-
19	Colombia, Cauca, 16 km east southeast of Páez	6.5	17.3	VI	Five people are killed and multiple are injured, 20 buildings are damaged in the Bogota area. One person also killed at Manizales and another at Miraflores. 520 buildings are either damaged or collapsed in the Boyaca and Casanare departments.	7	14
21	Indonesia, North Maluku offshore, 155 km northwest of Tobelo	6.2	42.2	-	-	-	-
21	Russia, Sakhalin offshore, 46 km south of Shikotan	6.3	58.9	V	-	-	-
22	Colombia, Cauca, 9 km east of Páez	5.7	21.3	VI	Caused damage to houses in the eastern Boyaca department.	-	-
24	Iran, Hormozgan, 76 km west northwest of Bandar Abbas	5.0	33.0	IV	Eleven people were injured in the Bandar Abbas area, some houses sustained damage.	-	11
24	Papua New Guinea, Bouganville Island offshore, 119 km west northwest of Panguna	6.2	24.5	V	-	-	-
27	Indonesia, Central Papua offshore, 164 km southwest of Nabire	6.8	22.3	VI	-	-	-
29	United States, Washington, 3 km west southwest of Des Moines	5.0	15.4	-	Damage reported in Auburn and Tacoma.	-	-
29	Turkey, Erzurum, 10 km south southwest of Aşkale	5.2	31.1	-	Fifty-eight houses are reported damaged in the Aşkale area.	-	-

February
- Strongest: 7.1 M_{w} New Zealand
- Deadliest: 6.4 M_{w} Colombia; 42 deaths
- Total fatalities: 46

Number by magnitude
- 9.0+: 0
- 8.0–8.9: 0
- 7.0–7.9: 1
- 6.0–6.9: 16

=== February ===
Date	Country and location	M_{w}	Depth (km)	MMI	Notes	Casualties	
Date	Country and location	M_{w}	Depth (km)	MMI	Notes	Dead	Injured
2	Papua New Guinea, Kandrian-Gloucester, 83 km west of Kandrian	6.0	57.8	V	-	-	-
3	Balleny Islands, offshore	6.4	10.0	-	-	-	-
5	Panama, Puntarenas offshore, 137 km south of Punta Burica	6.0	11.7	-	-	-	-
5	New Zealand, North Island offshore, 118 km north northeast of Gisborne	7.1	21.1	VII	-	-	-
8	Colombia, Valle de Cauca, 24 km northwest of Darien.	6.4	73.5	VI	Main article: 1995 Choco earthquake	42	400
10	New Zealand, North Island offshore, 102 km north northeast of Gisborne	6.5	28.3	VI	-	-	-
10	Chile, Tarapaca, 148 km east northeast of Iquique	5.6	118.2	IV	Damage reported in the Iquique area.	-	-
11	Colombia, San Andres, 14 km east of San Andrés.	5.7	10.7	VI	Damage to tall buildings, power outages on Isla de San Andres	-	-
13	New Zealand, North Island offshore, 125 km east northeast of Ōpōtiki	6.0	28.2	VI	-	-	-
13	Indonesia, Halmahera offshore, 223 km south of Sofifi	6.3	14.2	VI	-	-	-
13	Indonesia, Halmahera offshore, 226 km south of Sofifi	6.3	17.2	VII	-	-	-
13	Indonesia, Halmahera offshore, 227 km south of Sofifi	6.7	14.2	VIII	-	-	-
14	Chile, El Loa, 72 km southeast of San Pedro de Atacana	6.0	147.4	-	-	-	-
19	Philippines, 90 km east southeast of Sarangi	6.0	75.8	-	-	-	-
19	United States, California, 126 km west of Ferndale	6.6	4.6	V	-	-	-
21	Russia, Sakhalin offshore, 297 km east northeast of Kurilsk	6.2	31.5	-	-	-	-
23	Japan, Iwate offshore, 147 km east of Miyako	6.2	9.1	-	-	-	-
23	Taiwan, Hualien County, 17 km north of Hualien City	6.2	40.9	V	Two people killed and 14 injured after a bus was struck by a landslide	2	14
23	Japan, Iwate offshore, 140 km east of Miyako	6.1	33.0	-	-	-	-
23	Cyprus, Paphos District, 10 km northwest of Neo Chorio	5.9	10.0	VII	Main article: 1995 Paphos earthquake	2	5

March
- Strongest: 6.9 M_{w} Indonesia
- Total fatalities: 0

Number by magnitude
- 9.0+: 0
- 8.0–8.9: 0
- 7.0–7.9: 0
- 6.0–6.9: 8

=== March ===
Date	Country and location	M_{w}	Depth (km)	MMI	Notes	Casualties	
Date	Country and location	M_{w}	Depth (km)	MMI	Notes	Dead	Injured
6	Indonesia, North Kalimantan offshore, 98 km southeast of Tarakan	6.1	16.7	VI	-	-	-
8	Guadeloupe, Basse-Terre, offshore 164 km east of Beauséjour	6.2	8.1	-	-	-	-
12	Papua New Guinea, Madang Province, 105 km east of Madang	6.0	217.0	IV	-	-	-
14	United States, Alaska, 70 km east southeast of King Cove	6.2	35.1	IV	-	-	-
19	Indonesia, Central Papua offshore, 110 km south southwest of Nabire	6.1	19.2	VII	-	-	-
19	Indonesia, Central Papua offshore, 100 km south southwest of Nabire	6.9	33.0	VII	Damage to buildings in the Ayam and Fakfak regions	-	-
25	Solomon Islands, Nendo Island, 46 km southeast of Lata	6.2	79.4	-	-	-	-
26	South Georgia and the South Sandwich Islands	6.3	48.4	-	-	-	-
26	United States, Alaska, 65 km east southeast of King Cove	5.5	38.2	V	Items thrown off shelves at Cold Bay.	-	-
26	Ecuador, Guayas, 13 km north northwest of Naranjito	5.6	90.6	IV	Damage in the Guaranda area.	-	-

=== April ===
April
- Strongest: 7.4 M_{w} Tonga
- Total fatalities: 0

Number by magnitude
- 9.0+: 0
- 8.0–8.9: 0
- 7.0–7.9: 2
- 6.0–6.9: 0

Date	Country and location	M_{w}	Depth (km)	MMI	Notes	Casualties	
Date	Country and location	M_{w}	Depth (km)	MMI	Notes	Dead	Injured
7	Tonga, Niuatoputapu offshore, 88 km north northeast of Hihifo	7.4	21.2	V	-	-	-
21	Philippines, Samar, 10 km east of Dapdap	7.2	20.7	VII	Damage sustained in Borongan and Sulat	-	-

=== May ===
May
- Strongest: 7.7 M_{w} Russia
- Deadliest: 7.7 M_{w} Russia; 1,989 deaths
- Total fatalities: 1,989

Number by magnitude
- 9.0+: 0
- 8.0–8.9: 0
- 7.0–7.9: 1
- 6.0–6.9: 2

Date	Country and location	M_{w}	Depth (km)	MMI	Notes	Casualties	
Date	Country and location	M_{w}	Depth (km)	MMI	Notes	Dead	Injured
13	Kozani and Grevena, Greece	6.6	14.0	X	Main article: 1995 Kozani–Grevena earthquake	-	25
14	In the Ombai Strait, Indonesia	6.9	12.9	VIII	Main article: 1995 TImor earthquake The associated tsunami had a maximum depth of 4 m.	-	19
27	Neftegorsk in northern Sakhalin Island, Russia	7.1	11.0	IX	Main article: 1995 Neftegorsk earthquake Neftegorsk was nearly destroyed completely by the earthquake.	1,989	750

=== July ===
July
- Strongest: 8.0 M_{w} Chile
- Deadliest: 7.3 M_{w} Myanmar; 11 deaths
- Total fatalities: 14

Number by magnitude
- 9.0+: 0
- 8.0–8.9: 1
- 7.0–7.9: 1
- 6.0–6.9: 0

Date	Country and location	M_{w}	Depth (km)	MMI	Notes	Casualties	
Date	Country and location	M_{w}	Depth (km)	MMI	Notes	Dead	Injured
11	Shan State, Myanmar, near the border with Yunnan	7.3	12.5 km (USGS) 9.0 km (CEA)	VII	Main article: 1995 Myanmar–China earthquake This was one of a few earthquakes ever successfully predicted.	11	136
30	Chilean Sea near Antofagasta	8.0	46 km	VII	Main article: 1995 Antofagasta earthquake Associated tsunami of 2-3 m.	3	58-59

=== September ===
September
- Strongest: 7.4 M_{w} Mexico
- Deadliest: 7.4 M_{w} Mexico; 3 deaths
- Total fatalities: 3

Number by magnitude
- 9.0+: 0
- 8.0–8.9: 0
- 7.0–7.9: 1
- 6.0–6.9: 0

Date	Country and location	M_{w}	Depth (km)	MMI	Notes	Casualties	
Date	Country and location	M_{w}	Depth (km)	MMI	Notes	Dead	Injured
14	Guerrero, Mexico	7.4	23 km	VII	Main article: 1995 Guerrero earthquake Heavy damage to houses in rural areas.	3	-

=== October ===
October
- Strongest: 8.0 M_{w} Mexico
- Total fatalities: 102-111

Number by magnitude
- 9.0+: 0
- 8.0–8.9: 1
- 7.0–7.9: 1
- 6.0–6.9: 1

Date	Country and location	M_{w}	Depth (km)	MMI	Notes	Casualties	
Date	Country and location	M_{w}	Depth (km)	MMI	Notes	Dead	Injured
9	Off the coast of Jalisco, Mexico	8.0	40 km	VII	Main article: 1995 Colima–Jalisco earthquake The associated tsunami had a maximum height of 5.1 m.	49-58	100
20	Chiapas, Mexico, near Tuxtla Gutiérrez	7.2	159.3 km	VI	Main article: 1995 Chiapas earthquake	-	70
23	Fenduo Village (芬多村), Fawo Township (发窝乡) of the Wuding County, Yunnan, China	6.2	10 km	-	Main article: 1995 Wuding earthquake	53	13,903

=== November ===
October
- Strongest: 7.3 M_{w} Egypt
- Total fatalities: 9-12

Number by magnitude
- 9.0+: 0
- 8.0–8.9: 0
- 7.0–7.9: 1
- 6.0–6.9: 0

Date	Country and location	M_{w}	Depth (km)	MMI	Notes	Casualties	
Date	Country and location	M_{w}	Depth (km)	MMI	Notes	Dead	Injured
22	The central segment of the Gulf of Aqaba, Egypt	7.3	18 km	VIII	Main article: 1995 Gulf of Aqaba earthquake A small tsumani was observed following the earthquake. Damage occurred in Egypt, Saudi Arabia, Israel, and Jordan.	9-12	30-69
