= 1875 Dinar earthquake =

Earthquake in southwest Turkey

- Location within Turkey
- Local date: May 3, 1875
- Magnitude: 6.77 M_{w}
- Epicenter: 38.3°N 29.9°E
- Areas affected: Dinar (District), Afyonkarahisar, Turkey
- Max. intensity: MMI IX (Violent)
- Casualties: 1,300 fatalities

The 1875 Dinar earthquake occurred in Afyonkarahisar Province in present-day Turkey. More than 1,300 people died and 1,000 homes were destroyed when the M_{w} 6.77 earthquake struck. The communities of Çivril and Yaka were destroyed while Işıklı and Dinar were badly damaged. Ground fissures and hot springs appeared near Civril although these reports may have been exaggerated. There was minor damage in Uşak and Afyon.

The shock was associated with rupture along the Baklan Fault which was also associated with another destructive shock in 1995. It produced 20 km (12 mi) of faulting.

At Işıklı, 200 homes were razed while the remaining 100 were damaged to the extent they were unliveable for occupants. Two mosque however, stood intact. Nearly all homes in Çivril were badly damaged or destroyed and 500 bodies were recovered from debris. Early reports from the Ottoman press reported 133 to 164 deaths and 1,879 injuries. In the village of Tatar, Uşak, about 200 people died.

== See also ==
- List of earthquakes in Turkey
