= Atiq Mosque (Esna) =

Mosque in Esna, Egypt

- المسجد العتيق

Religion
- Affiliation: Islam
- Status: Active

Location
- Location: Asfun Al-Matana, Luxor Governorate
- Country: Egypt

Architecture
- Completed: 1076-1077

The Atiq Mosque (Arabic: المسجد العتيق, lit. 'old mosque') is a moqsue in Asfun Al-Matana, a village 10 kilometers west of the city of Esna in Luxor, Egypt. It is also known as the Al-Omari Mosque due to being a similar size to the Amr ibn al-As Mosque of Cairo. This mosque dates back to the Fatimid era, and was built in the year 1076-1077 AD by the Fatmid Emir Nasir Saif Al-Islam Al-Mustansiri.

== Description ==
The old mosque was demolished and rebuilt several times, altering its original features. Only the minaret, which is considered to be one of the oldest dated minarets in Islamic Egypt, remains the same. It shares the style of many minarets of Upper Egypt: three levels with dressed ashlar brickwork, and pavilions with arched openings, topped by small domes. A sundial, crafted by Khalil Effendi Ibrahim, an astronomical mapmaker, rests on the minaret's base, dating back to 1878 AD.

The mosque was renovated and stabilized after the 1992 Cairo earthquake. The mosque was also renovated in 2026.

The mihrab of the mosque contains a marble plaque commemorating its foundation. It is inscribed in Kufic script and contains Quranic verses and prayers and supplications asking for mercy for the founder of the mosque.
