= 1995 Choco earthquake =

Magnitude 6.4 earthquake in Colombia

- Location within Colombia
- UTC time: 1995-02-08 18:40:25
- ISC event: 118073
- USGS-ANSS: ComCat
- Local date: 8 February 1995
- Local time: 13:41
- Magnitude: M_{w} 6.4
- Depth: 73.5 km (45.7 mi)
- Epicenter: 4.104°N 76.622°W
- Areas affected: Calarca, Cali, La Union, Manizales, Pereira, Trujillo and many other areas of western Colombia.
- Total damage: US$2,500,000 (equivalent to $5,282,267 in 2025)
- Max. intensity: MMI VI (Strong)
- Landslides: 2 occurred near epicenter
- Casualties: 42 fatalities, 400 injuries

A moment magnitude 6.4 earthquake affected the Valle del Cauca, Choco, and Risaralda departments of Colombia on February 8, 1995, at 18:40 UTC. Its epicenter was located 42.5 kilometres (26.4 mi) west-northwest of Buga. The earthquake was felt in much of Colombia and there was major damage.

== Earthquake ==
The earthquake had a moment magnitude of 6.4 and a depth of 73.5 kilometres (45.7 mi). The epicenter was 24 kilometres (15 mi) northwest of the town of Darién, at 4.104°N 76.622°W. Tremors were felt across Colombia, reaching as far out as Bogota. Due to the location of the earthquake and its tectonic setting, it was not as strong in parts such as northern Colombia. Its corresponding focal mechanism pointed to normal faulting. Aftershocks were later reported with various magnitudes ranging between 3.0 and 5.6.

== Impact ==
Over 2,000 buildings across the area were damaged and 700 were reported to have collapsed. 4 schools and 22 community centers in the areas affected were damaged, as well as a provincial government building, colleges, police stations, and offices. Telephone poles were destroyed, and utilities such as electricity and water were cut off as water mains burst and wires were split. Two highways were blocked due to landslides that were caused by the earthquake.

Shortly after the earthquake, relief teams were deployed made up of Red Cross personnel, firemen, policemen, and civil defense officers. A state of emergency was later declared by the Colombian Government in response to the earthquake. Many walls and buildings had collapsed, causing multiple deaths in towns such as Palestina, Armenia, and Pereria.

== Aftermath ==
Over 7,000 people were impacted by the earthquake. 3,000 were left homeless due to the substantial damage caused by the quake. Immediately after the initial earthquake, medical teams were sent out to aid people who were injured, with some cases having to airlift patients due to the damage. Blood was brought to victims who required it from national resources, and first aid tents were set up.

Relief supplies were sent out, with kits including corrugated iron and plastic sheets, mattresses, blankets, sanitation kits, and emergency food rations. Cash grants of US$20,000 were given out to people as well for personal belonging replacements.

Many homeless people stayed with their friends or relatives on industrialized areas or coffee farms, while others were brought to temporary shelters set up in schools or tent camps. During reconstruction, there were concerns about housing for the homeless.

== See also ==
- List of earthquakes in Colombia
- List of earthquakes in 1995
- 1994 Páez River earthquake
