= List of earthquakes in Egypt =

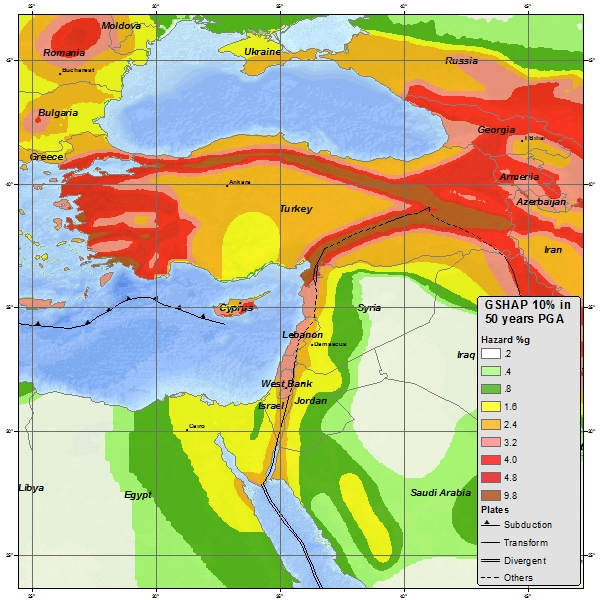
Seismic hazard for the Eastern Mediterranean from the Global Seismic Hazard Assessment Program (GSHAP) in terms of peak ground acceleration with a 10% chance of being exceeded (or a 90% chance of not being exceeded) within the next 50 years

This is a list of earthquakes in Egypt, including earthquakes that either had their epicenter in Egypt, or caused significant damage in Egypt.

== Seismic hazard ==
Seismic hazard in Egypt is highest at the southern end of the Gulf of Suez, the northern Red Sea and around the Gulf of Aqaba, the location of the active plate boundaries. The highest risk is the southern end of the Dead Sea Transform.

== Notable earthquakes ==
Date	Time‡	Place	Lat	Long	Fatalities	Mag.	Comments	Sources
July 21, 365	Sunrise	Alexandria; See 365 Crete earthquake	35.0	23.0	Many thousands	8.5+ M_{w}	Felt widely in Egypt, Alexandria was severely damaged by the tsunami	
November 27, 885		Cairo	30.0	31.1	1,000	X		
March 18, 1068	Morning	Hejaz see 1068 Near East earthquakes	29.5	34.95	~20,000	≥7.0	Affected a wide area of Egypt, Sinai, Hejaz. The location given is the macroseismic epicenter, although the earthquake was probably located in the Gulf of Aqaba	
October 18, 1754		Cairo see 1754 Cairo earthquake	30.8	31.0	40,000		The death toll is questioned, but is not unreasonable for a shallow earthquake in an area of high population density	
August 7, 1847		Faiyum	29.5	30.5	185	XI		
October 12, 1856	02:38 or 02:45	Crete, Greece see 1856 Heraklion earthquake	35.5	26.0	10+	7.7-8.3 M_{w}	Despite having an epicenter off the Greek islands, the earthquake was so powerful that in Egypt, intensity VIII was experienced. This caused damage to Alexandria, Cairo and the Nile delta with several deaths.	
September 12, 1955	06:09	Offshore Alexandria see 1955 Alexandria earthquake	32.2	29.6	18	6.3 M_{s}	89 injured	
March 31, 1969	07:15	Red Sea, Sharm El Sheikh see 1969 Sharm El Sheikh earthquake	27.58	33.9	2	6.6 M_{w}	15 injured	
October 12, 1992	13:09	Dahshur, Egypt see 1992 Cairo earthquake	29.778	31.144	561	5.8 mb	12,392 injured	
November 22, 1995	04:15	Gulf of Aqaba see 1995 Gulf of Aqaba earthquake	28.826	34.799	9–12	7.3 M_{w}	30–69 injured	

== See also ==
- Geology of Egypt
