= 1995 Neftegorsk earthquake =

1995 devastating earthquake in Sakhalin, Russia

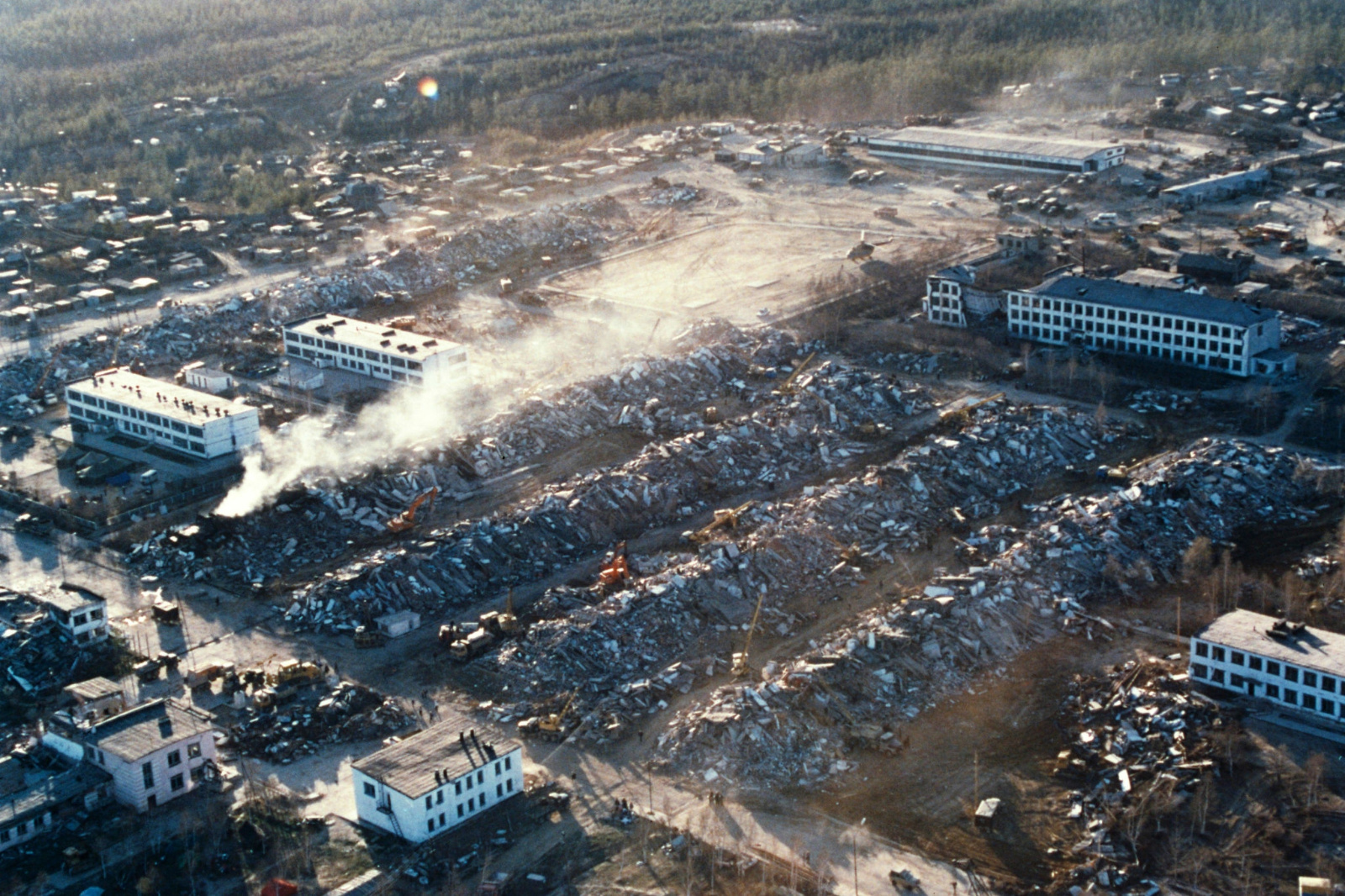
- Destruction in Neftegorsk following the earthquake

- Location within Far Eastern Federal District
- UTC time: 1995-05-27 13:03:52
- ISC event: 106336
- USGS-ANSS: ComCat
- Local date: 28 May 1995
- Local time: 01:03 a.m.
- Duration: 17 seconds
- Magnitude: M_{wb}^{(USGS)} 7.1 (Note: ISC reports it as M_{w}^{(ISC)} 7.1, a research paper reports it as M_{s} 7.2., other research papers put it at M_{s} 7.6, while yet another paper reports it as a magnitude 7.8, scale unknown)
- Depth: 11.0 km (7 mi)
- Epicenter: 52.63°N 142.83°E
- Fault: Upper Piltun fault
- Type: Strike-slip
- Areas affected: Sakhalin, Russian Far East
- Total damage: $64.1–300 million
- Max. intensity: MMI IX (Violent)
- Casualties: 1,989 dead 750 injured

The 1995 Neftegorsk earthquake occurred on 28 May at 01:03 local time in northern Sakhalin Island in the Russian Far East. It was the most destructive earthquake known within the modern borders of Russia, with a magnitude of M_{w} 7.1 and maximum Mercalli intensity of IX (Violent) that devastated the town of Neftegorsk. Many buildings collapsed, and 1,989 of its 3,977 citizens were killed, with another 750 injured. Infrastructure was catastrophically damaged, leading to Neftegorsk becoming a ghost town. Surface effects from the earthquake were widespread, with many geological features changing or developing. Due to its location along a poorly understood plate boundary, the earthquake received considerable attention from scientists, and dozens of research papers have been written about it.

== Tectonic setting ==
Sakhalin lies along the destructive plate boundary zone between the Amur microplate (part of the Eurasian plate system) and the Okhotsk microplate (part of the North American plate system). The Sakhalin-Hokkaido fault is the main plate boundary in Sakhalin that runs along the island with a slip rate of 4 mm (0.16 in)/yr. Unlike most of the plate boundary, faulting in North Sakhalin is predominantly strike-slip.

In the area near the earthquake, three faults take up the brunt of the slip: the Gyrgylanye-Dagy, Piltun-Goromai, and Upper Piltun (also known as the Verkhnii Pil'tun or Gyrgylan'i–Ossoy) faults. The Piltun-Goromai fault runs along the eastern coast of Sakhalin for 40–90 km (25–56 mi) in a roughly north-south alignment with a slip rate of 3–5 mm (0.12–0.20 in)/yr. Along the Piltun-Goromai fault, strong earthquakes recur every 2,300–5,000 years.

The Upper Piltun fault—which ruptured in the 1995 Neftegorsk earthquake—branches west of the Piltun-Goromai fault and runs south-south-west until it reaches the Gyrgylanye-Dagy fault. To the west, it has a strike of 15 degrees and a dip of 60-70 degrees. Three large events in the past 1,800 years have been identified along the Upper Piltun fault. A magnitude 7.8 earthquake occurred on the fault 2,600 years ago, and another large event occurred 4,000 years ago. Recurrence interval of large earthquakes on the Upper Piltun fault is estimated to be 400 years. When geodetic data was collected on the fault between 1941 and 1970, the fault was likely locked and accumulating stress. The lack of previously recorded seismicity also implies that the fault was locked.

The Gyrgylanye-Dagy fault is the westernmost of the three, running parallel to the Piltun-Goromai fault. The slip rate is estimated to be at least 1 mm (0.039 in)/yr. Prior to this earthquake, North Sakhalin had been relatively aseismic, with the largest earthquake in the area being the M_{w} 5.8 Nogliki earthquake of 1964.

== Earthquake ==
The earthquake struck on May 28 at 1:04 local time in northern Sakhalin in the Russian Far East near the town of Neftegorsk. This M_{w} 7.1 earthquake had a maximum Mercalli intensity of IX (Violent), with ESI intensity reaching XI. The earthquake was also reported to be M_{s} 7.2–7.6 and M_{uk} 7.8, depending on the source. The earthquake struck on the right-lateral strike-slip Upper Piltun fault. The earthquake was felt widely across the island, and nearby portions of mainland Asia experienced shaking as well. Sabo and Tungor experienced MSK VII (Very strong) shaking, while Okha and Nogliki felt MSK VI (Strong). On mainland Asia, Lazarev felt MSK IV (Largely observed) shaking. There were over 1,000 aftershocks recorded in the first month and a half, with none exceeding M_{s} 5. The aftershocks spanned a length of 60–80 km (37–50 mi) along the Upper Piltun fault.

The shock ruptured for 35–46 km (22–29 mi) at a strike of 15 degrees, with an average slip of 3.6–3.9 m (12–13 ft). The depth of faulting extended to 10–20 km (6.2–12.4 mi) deep. Three separate segments of fault ruptured, with the northern section slipping the most. Horizontal (right-lateral strike slip) slip peaked at 8.1 m (27 ft), with the minor vertical (reverse) component peaking at 1.5–1.7 m (4 ft 11 in – 5 ft 7 in). The stress drop (how much less stress the fault is under after the earthquake) as a result of this quake was 4–11 MPa, a value typical of an intraplate earthquake. The large peak slip (8.1 m (27 ft)) and the lack of magnitude 5 or larger aftershocks suggest that the mainshock released a significant majority of the accumulated strain on the fault.

== Impact ==
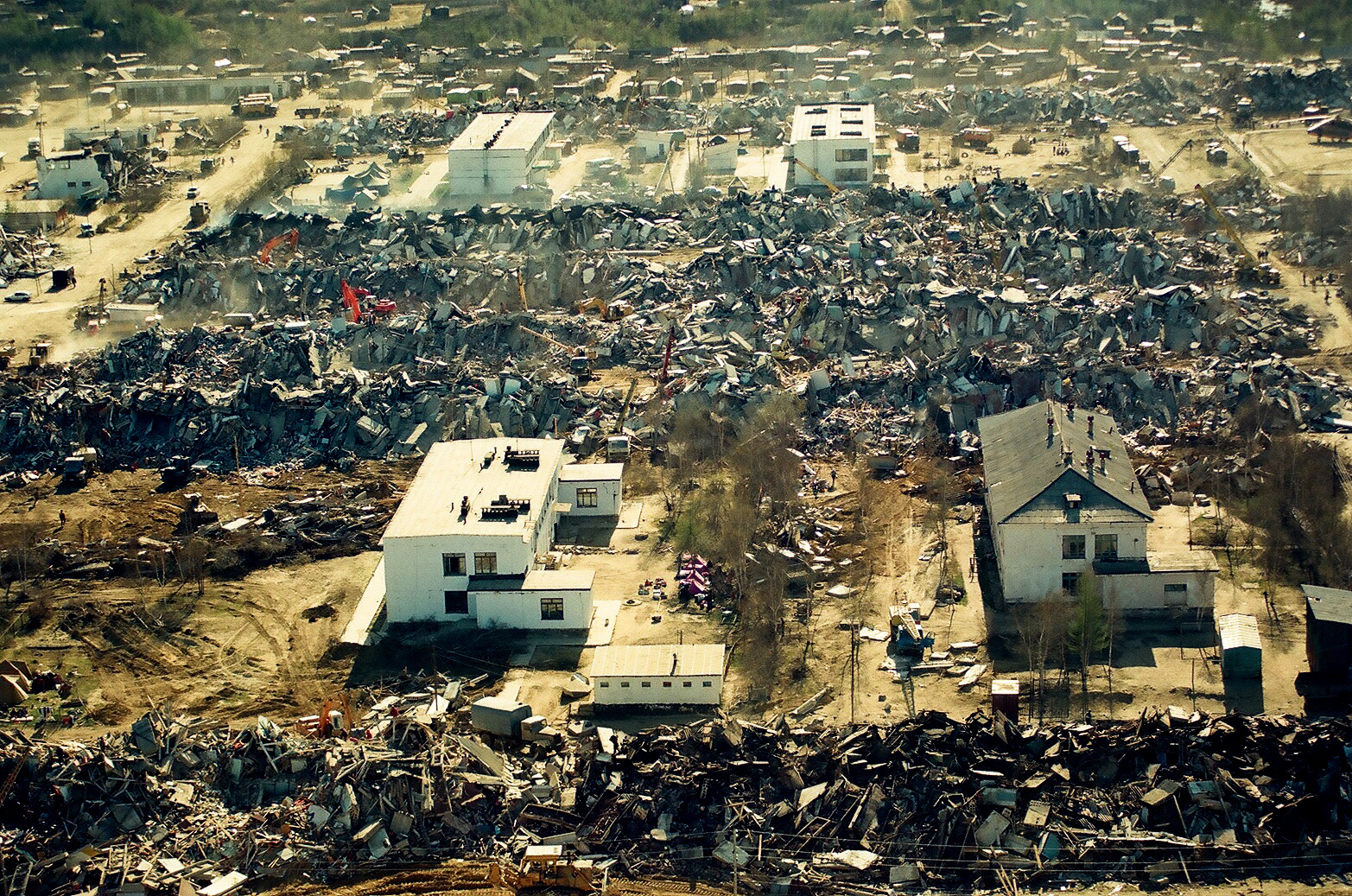
Aerial view of Neftegorsk after disaster

Due to the previous lack of strong earthquakes in the area, Neftegorsk was affected to a greater extent as it was unprepared. During the earthquake, 17 five-story residential buildings collapsed, leading to the deaths of 1,989 and 750 more injured. These buildings housed a majority of the town's population, and 90% of the fatalities were caused by the collapses. These buildings were designed to only withstand MSK VI (Strong) rather than the IX (Destructive) – X (Devastating) experienced by Neftegorsk. The 650 residents who lived in the shorter brick buildings—which didn't collapse—survived the earthquake. In nearby Okha, furniture broke and balconies fell off from two five-story buildings. This earthquake was the most destructive earthquake ever recorded within modern day Russian borders.

The earthquake instantly cut off the power, water, and telephone lines, and severely damaged infrastructure, with "destruction of buildings, bridges, railways and roads, breakage of oil and gas pipelines, electric and communication lines". The administration building, a building to generate heat, and some shops were also destroyed. The destroyed railway had deformation up to 300 m (980 ft) long, with locations close to the rupture even experiencing wave-like bends. Two oil pipelines were badly damaged in the area, and as a result began leaking oil which seeped into small lakes. Telegraph poles, railways beds, and even a locomotive at the railway station–all shifted to the east-southeast. The Belgian Centre for Research on the Epidemiology of Disasters' EM-DAT database places the total damage at $64.1 million, while the United States' National Geophysical Data Center assesses the damage at $300 million.

=== Geological effects ===
The earthquake caused significant surface changes, including landslides, new islands, surface fractures, liquefaction, and mud volcanoes. Landslides damaged roads, and were observed on almost every coastal slope near the rupture area. The largest landslide was 50 km^{3} (12 cu mi) and blocked the Cadylanye River for a short period. Mud volcanoes cropped up both near the fault and dozens of kilometers away, with the strongest and most concentrated examples occurring 25 km (16 mi) from the source. Surface ruptures were widespread across northern Sakhalin. In Piltun Bay, several new small, sandy islands formed. Liquefaction was observed outside the epicentral region along the seashore.

== Aftermath ==
=== Response ===
Immediately after the earthquake struck, Russian rescue teams from the surrounding areas prepared to deliver aid, involving eighteen planes and helicopters. However, some aid aircraft were unable to land due to heavy fog. As the temperature across the Sakhalin region was bitterly cold, the cargo included blankets along with food. The Russian government allocated 30 billion rubles to use on rescue and aid. Authorities were able to secure basic necessities for survivors providing food, water, and shelter. The largest transport planes faced challenges in delivering their cargo to Neftegorsk as they were too large to land at the nearby airport. Field hospitals were set up and hundreds of injured victims were medevaced to larger nearby cities such as Khabarovsk. Japan offered up "tents, sleeping bags, blankets, and medical supplies", but then President of Russia Boris Yeltsin personally turned it down due to worries about the Kuril Islands dispute.

After the rescue operations had been carried out, Russian authorities decided not to rebuild Neftegorsk, ostensibly because of the residents' desire to move away from the trauma of the earthquake. However, the LA Times attributed the decision to the Russian treasury shortage of funds and diminished potential of the nearby oil wells. When government officials offered a chance to move elsewhere on Sakhalin, the former residents wanted only compensation rather than a new place of residence on the island. After the earthquake, Neftegorsk completely emptied out and became a ghost town. Due to the unprecedented and unpredicted seismicity in the area, the building code and seismic risk maps were soon updated to reflect the earthquake and its impacts.

=== Scientific interest ===
At the time of the event, the maps of the plate boundary between the Amur microplate and the Okhotsk microplate were poorly defined, as the area had never experienced severe earthquakes. In the aftermath of the Neftegorsk earthquake, many scientific studies were conducted to help understand the earthquake and the tectonic background of the area it struck in. A total of 26 research papers have been published on the earthquake alone. Despite many seismic sensors being removed from the island just before the earthquake due to a lack of funding, it still provided valuable insight into understanding and resolving the insufficiently understood plate boundary.

== See also ==
- List of earthquakes in 1995
- List of earthquakes in Russia
