= Dinar, Afyonkarahisar =

Dinar
- Municipality
- Location within Turkey Location within Turkey Aegean
- Coordinates: 38°04′18″N 30°09′56″E
- Country: Turkey
- Province: Afyonkarahisar
- District: Dinar

Government
  - Mayor: Veysel Topçu (AK Party)
- Elevation: 880 m (2,890 ft)
- Population (2021): 26,300
- Time zone: UTC+3 (TRT)
- Climate: Csa
- Website: www.dinar.bel.tr

Dinar (Ancient Greek: Κελαιναί-Ἀπάμεια, romanized: Kelainaí-Apámeia,) is a town of Afyonkarahisar Province in the Aegean region of Turkey, 106 km from the city of Afyon. It is the seat of Dinar District. Its population is 26,300 (2021). The mayor was Saffet Acar (MHP) between 2019 and 2024. Veysel Topçu of CHP became the mayor of the town in the local election held on 31 March 2024.

The town is built amidst the ruins of Celaenae-Apamea, near the sources of the Büyük Menderes (Maeander) river. In ancient mythology this was the site of the musical duel between Apollo and Marsyas.

Dinar today is a small town in a rural area, with limited amenities, particularly since there was a large earthquake here in 1995, which caused many people to migrate away from the town. Dinar is a crossroads on journeys from Ankara or Istanbul to Antalya, motorists wouldn't stop here but many trucks do need to.

The folk culture of Dinar is rich, the town granted many well-known folk-songs (türkü in Turkish).

== History ==
From 1867 until 1922, Dinar was part of the Hüdavendigâr vilayet of the Ottoman Empire. It was badly damaged in a serious earthquake in 1875.

== Climate ==
Dinar has a hot-summer Mediterranean climate (Köppen: Csa), with hot, dry summers, and chilly, frequently snowy winters.

Climate data for Dinar (1991–2020)
Month	Jan	Feb	Mar	Apr	May	Jun	Jul	Aug	Sep	Oct	Nov	Dec	Year
Mean daily maximum °C (°F)	8.0 (46.4)	9.7 (49.5)	13.6 (56.5)	18.1 (64.6)	23.4 (74.1)	28.3 (82.9)	32.4 (90.3)	32.5 (90.5)	28.1 (82.6)	22.2 (72.0)	15.6 (60.1)	10.0 (50.0)	20.2 (68.4)
Daily mean °C (°F)	3.0 (37.4)	4.2 (39.6)	7.4 (45.3)	11.6 (52.9)	16.2 (61.2)	20.8 (69.4)	24.6 (76.3)	24.6 (76.3)	19.9 (67.8)	14.6 (58.3)	8.9 (48.0)	4.9 (40.8)	13.4 (56.1)
Mean daily minimum °C (°F)	−1.1 (30.0)	−.4 (31.3)	1.8 (35.2)	5.3 (41.5)	9.1 (48.4)	13.2 (55.8)	16.7 (62.1)	16.9 (62.4)	12.1 (53.8)	8.1 (46.6)	3.5 (38.3)	0.8 (33.4)	7.2 (45.0)
Average precipitation mm (inches)	49.09 (1.93)	39.07 (1.54)	48.74 (1.92)	56.34 (2.22)	52.85 (2.08)	36.46 (1.44)	14.97 (0.59)	18.21 (0.72)	16.66 (0.66)	42.19 (1.66)	39.81 (1.57)	48.9 (1.93)	463.29 (18.24)
Average precipitation days (≥ 1.0 mm)	7.2	6.8	7.1	7.7	7.6	4.3	3.1	2.8	2.9	5.0	5.3	7.5	67.3
Average relative humidity (%)	71.9	68.5	63.8	62.3	61.6	54.8	45.8	46.5	51.2	60.5	65.3	71.6	60.3
Source: NOAA
