= List of earthquakes in Saudi Arabia =

Earthquakes in Saudi Arabia are infrequent and usually occur in the western portion of the country near the Red Sea or the Gulf of Aqaba close to the boundaries of the Arabian Plate.

Date	Region	Mag.	MMI	Deaths	Injuries	Comments
2009-05-19	Al Madinah	5.7 M_{w}	VII		7	Landslides
2009-05-17	Umluj	4.6 mb	V			Homes damaged or destroyed
2004-06-09	Tabuk Region	4.6 M_{L}	V			Minor damage
1995-11-22	Egypt, Saudi Arabia, Israel, Jordan	7.3 M_{w}	VIII	9–12	30–69	Moderate damage / tsunami
1072	Yemen, Saudi Arabia		VIII	50		Moderate damage
1068-03-18-1068-05-29	Ramla, Jerusalem, Tabuk	≥ 7.0	IX	~ 20,000		Extreme damage
551-07-09	Lebanon, Egypt, Iraq, Saudi Arabia	7.5 M_{w}	IX	30,000+		Tsunami
Note: The inclusion criteria for adding events are based on WikiProject Earthquakes' notability guideline that was developed for stand alone articles. The principles described also apply to lists. In summary, only damaging, injurious, or deadly events should be recorded.

== See also ==
- Geology of Saudi Arabia
