= Okha, Russia =

Okha Оха
- Town
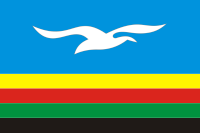
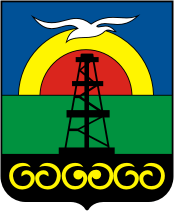
- Flag Coat of arms
- Interactive map of Okha
- Location of Okha Okha (Sakhalin Oblast)
- Coordinates: 53°35′20″N 142°56′57″E
- Country: Russia
- Federal subject: Sakhalin Oblast
- Administrative district: Okhinsky District
- Founded: 1880
- Town status since: 1938
- Elevation: 30 m (98 ft)

Population (2010 Census)
  - Total: 23,008
  - Estimate (2023): 19,888 (−13.6%)

Administrative status
  - Capital of: Okhinsky District

Municipal status
  - Urban okrug: Okhinsky Urban Okrug
  - Capital of: Okhinsky Urban Okrug
- Time zone: UTC+11 (MSK+8)
- Postal code: 69449x
- Dialing code: +7 42437
- OKTMO ID: 64736000001
- Website: www.okhacity.ru

Okha (Russian: Оха́) is a town and the administrative center of Okhinsky District of Sakhalin Oblast, Russia. Population: 23,008 (2010 census); 27,963 (2002 census); 36,104 (1989 Soviet census).

== Geography ==
Okha is located on the east coast of the far north of Sakhalin island, just south of the isthmus of the Schmidt Peninsula, approximately 850 km (530 mi) north of Yuzhno-Sakhalinsk, near the shoreline of the Sea of Okhotsk.

== History ==
It was founded shortly after the discovery of petroleum in the area in 1880, initially under the name Okhe. The name is derived from an Ainu word meaning Bad Water. Industrial exploitation of the petroleum reserves began in 1923, during the Japanese occupation of Sakhalin from 1920 to 1925. During this time the town was called Okutan (奥端町, Okutan-chō) or Okuhan (奥哈町, Okuhan-chō) depending on Kanji used. Town status was granted to it in 1938.

== Climate ==
Climate data for Okha/Oha, Sakhalin Oblast, Russia (2005–2015)
| Month | Jan | Feb | Mar | Apr | May | Jun | Jul | Aug | Sep | Oct | Nov | Dec | Year |
|---|---|---|---|---|---|---|---|---|---|---|---|---|---|
| Average precipitation mm (inches) | 38.0 (1.50) | 27.3 (1.07) | 49.4 (1.94) | 54.9 (2.16) | 52.8 (2.08) | 21.5 (0.85) | 36.6 (1.44) | 70.1 (2.76) | 84.2 (3.31) | 80.4 (3.17) | 57.5 (2.26) | 54.7 (2.15) | 627.4 (24.69) |
| Average relative humidity (%) (daily average) | 80 | 77 | 77 | 79 | 77 | 77 | 83 | 83 | 83 | 80 | 81 | 81 | 80 |
| Average dew point °C (°F) | −24 (−11) | −22 (−8) | −14 (7) | −6 (21) | 2 (36) | 10 (50) | 14 (57) | 14 (57) | 8 (46) | −1 (30) | −12 (10) | −20 (−4) | −4 (24) |
| Mean daily sunshine hours | 1.6 | 3.1 | 3.6 | 4.3 | 8.3 | 8.8 | 8.7 | 7.2 | 6.5 | 4.5 | 1.8 | 1.0 | 5.0 |
Source 1: Time and Date (2005–2015)
Source 2: Weather Atlas (sun hours)

The town suffered significant damage in the 1995 Neftegorsk earthquake that occurred on May 28, and was used as pivotal base for rescuers deployed to Neftegorsk, which was destroyed to the extent that it was not rebuilt. A number of survivors of Neftegorsk were later transferred to Okha. Another smaller earthquake hit the town on May 10, 2005, but there were no fatalities or significant damage.

== Administrative and municipal status ==
Within the framework of administrative divisions, Okha serves as the administrative center of Okhinsky District and is subordinated to it. As a municipal division, the town of Okha and ten rural localities of Okhinsky District are incorporated as Okhinsky Urban Okrug.

== Economy ==
Okha, along with the oblast's administrative center Yuzhno-Sakhalinsk, is the center of Sakhalin's petroleum industry. An oil pipeline and gas main runs from Okha to Komsomolsk-on-Amur on the Russian mainland. A number of oil wells exist in close proximity to the town, mainly controlled by the company Rosneft.

In 1920, during the Siberian Intervention, Japan occupied the northern part of Sakhalin Island, returning it to the Soviet Union in 1925 after the Treaty of Beijing was signed on January 20, 1925. However, Japan formed the state owned firm North Sakhalin Oil (Kita-Sakhalin Oil Co., Ltd. (北樺太石油)) which extracted oil from the OKHA Oil Field (Oha Oil Field (オハ油田)) near Okha on North Sakhalin from 1926 to 1944.

=== Transportation ===
The town is the northern end point for the island's road system. There was a rail connection to the island's narrow-gauge rail network at Nogliki; however, this was closed in 2006.

There is an airport in Okha with service to Khabarovsk and Yuzhno-Sakhalinsk.
