= 1754 Cairo earthquake =

Earthquake in Egypt

- Location within Egypt
- Local date: 18 October 1754
- Magnitude: M_{fa} 6.6
- Epicenter: 30.8°N 31.0°E
- Areas affected: Egypt
- Max. intensity: MMI VII (Very strong) – MMI IX (Violent)
- Casualties: 40,000 dead

A locally devastating earthquake rocked the city of Cairo in the Ottoman Empire (present-day Egypt) on 18 October 1754. Major damage occurred in the city, and an estimated 40,000 people were killed. Nicholas Ambraseys, a Greek seismologist, estimated the felt area magnitude (M_{fa}) at 6.6 and assigned a maximum intensity of VII–IX (Very strong–Violent).

== Damage ==
The quake was particularly destructive in the City of the Dead, Boulaq, and regions of present-day New Cairo. Many homes were destroyed, killing many residents. The Saint Catherine's Monastery was damaged and required repairs. About two-thirds of the buildings in Cairo fell. Shaking was felt for an area of 150,000 km^{2}. Some historians have misdated the event to September 2, 1754, in confusion with another earthquake in Anatolia. At least 40,000 people died due to the shallow depth of focus and location in a densely populated area. The high death toll figure is disputed.

== See also ==
- List of earthquakes in Egypt
- List of historical earthquakes
