= 1995 Colima–Jalisco earthquake =

Earthquake in Mexico

- Location within Mexico
- UTC time: 1995-10-09 15:35:56
- ISC event: 75476
- USGS-ANSS: ComCat
- Local date: October 9, 1995
- Local time: 10:35
- Magnitude: 8.0 M_{w}
- Depth: 40 km (25 mi)
- Epicenter: 19.08°N 104.18°W
- Areas affected: Mexico
- Max. intensity: MMI VIII (Severe)
- Tsunami: Yes
- Casualties: 49–58 dead 100 injured

The 1995 Colima–Jalisco earthquake occurred on October 9 at 15:35 UTC with a moment magnitude of 8.0 and a maximum Mercalli intensity of VIII (Severe). The shock occurred off the coast of Jalisco, Mexico, where a tsunami was triggered that affected a 200 km (120 mi) stretch of the coast. The earthquake could be felt in Mexico City and in high-rise buildings in Dallas and Houston. In Mexico, the Cihuatlan-Manzanillo was the most severely affected area. At least 49 people died and 100 were injured.

== Tectonic setting ==
This earthquake occurred in the area where the Rivera plate subducts beneath the North American plate. It was the result of the relative movements between the North American plate, the Rivera plate, and the Cocos plate.

== Damage ==
Although the tsunami affected a 200 km stretch of coast, severe damage was confined to areas with shallow shoreline topography. Most of the flooding occurred in the Tenacatita Bay area. Landslides blocked roads between Guadalajara and Manzanillo. In Manzanillo, 18 people died in the collapse of an eight-story hotel.

== Characteristics ==
=== Earthquake ===
The earthquake rupture lasted for about a minute and involved a 200 km long break along the plate boundary. The greatest displacement of the fault is about 5 m. A 14 cm subsidence occurred at Manzanillo.

The variations in observed seismic intensity indicate that three asperities were ruptured during this event.

=== Tsunami ===
The tsunami had a maximum run-up height of 5.1 m. There were at least two waves recorded. The tsunami was also observed in Ecuador, French Polynesia, Samoan Islands, Australia and Hawaii.

=== Postseismic moment release ===
The aftershocks of this earthquake marked a rectangular region of about 170 km by 70 km. Postseismic deformation has been recorded after the main shock. If the postseismic moment release up to about two weeks after the main shock is included, it will be equivalent to 35% of that of the main shock, which will make the additional seismic moment equivalent to that of an M_{w} 7.7 earthquake.

== See also ==
- List of earthquakes in 1995
- List of earthquakes in Mexico
