= Neftegorsk, Sakhalin Oblast =

Ghost town in Sakhalin Oblast, Russia

Coordinates: 52°59′48″N 142°56′47″E

Neftegorsk (Russian: Нефтего́рск), formerly Vostok (Восто́к, lit. east) before 1970, is a ghost town in Sakhalin Oblast, Russia.

== Founding ==
The town was built in 1963. It was an urban-type oil-mining settlement, with its name meaning "Oil Town".

== Destruction ==
The town was devastated by an earthquake on May 28, 1995, which measured 7.1 on the moment magnitude scale, killing 1,989 out of a total population of 3,977. An oil-producing town in northern Sakhalin, many buildings in Neftegorsk had been built with low-quality concrete and were not designed to withstand seismic activity. Matthew Brezezinski gives an account in his book Casino Moscow:

"This was Neftegorsk, literally Oiltown, a Soviet-era housing project for roughnecks and their families. Although it was built alongside a tectonic fault line, central planners had not bothered to pour the flexible, reinforced foundations required by building codes in earthquake zones throughout the world. Instead, they just slapped up the usual shoddy precast concrete structures. In May 1995, an earthquake measuring 8.0 on the Richter scale had erupted just a dance was getting underway at the Neftegorsk cultural centre. When the dust settled three minutes later, two thousand people were dead, and the whole place had been leveled."

As is common in remote Russian industrial towns, almost the entire population lived in a small number of high-density four-to-five-story apartment buildings. The earthquake destroyed many of these, reducing them to piles of rubble. On multiple streets in the small town, every building collapsed and all residents were killed. Because of the comprehensive nature of the death and destruction in Neftegorsk, it was decided not to be rebuilt, and a memorial was instead constructed in the area. The monument contains aerial pictures of the town both before and immediately after its destruction, allowing visitors a sense of scale of the disaster. Many survivors were relocated to other towns in Sakhalin such as Okha, Yuzhno-Sakhalinsk, and Nogliki, while others left Sakhalin for the mainland.

== Population ==
Population
1979	1989	1995
3,974	3,507	0
