= 1995 Wuding earthquake =

Natural disaster in Yunnan, China

- Location within China
- UTC time: 1995-10-23 22:46:53
- ISC event: 80358
- USGS-ANSS: ComCat
- Local date: October 24, 1995
- Local time: 06:46:53 CST
- Magnitude: M_{w} 6.2
- Depth: 10 km (6.2 mi)
- Epicenter: 26.003°N 102.227°E
- Areas affected: China
- Casualties: 53 dead

The 1995 Wuding earthquake occurred on October 23, 1995, at 22:46 UTC (October 24, 1995, at 06:46 local time). The epicenter was located near Fenduo Village (芬多村), Fawo Township (发窝乡) of the Wuding County, Yunnan, China. The magnitude of the earthquake was put at M_{w} 6.2, or M_{s} 6.5. Fifty-three people were reported dead and 13,903 injured. Many houses and public buildings were damaged, including the Fawo Middle School (发窝中学) and the Fawo Township Office. This earthquake could be felt in southwestern Sichuan.

== See also ==
- List of earthquakes in 1995
- List of earthquakes in Yunnan
- List of earthquakes in China
