= 1995 Gulf of Aqaba earthquake =

November 1995 earthquake in Egypt

- UTC time: 1995-11-22 04:15:11
- ISC event: 70282
- USGS-ANSS: ComCat
- Local date: November 22, 1995
- Local time: 06:15
- Magnitude: 7.3 M_{w}
- Depth: 18 km (11 mi)
- Epicenter: 28.826°N 34.799°E
- Type: Strike-slip
- Areas affected: Egypt, Israel, Jordan; Saudi Arabia
- Max. intensity: MMI VIII (Severe)
- Tsunami: Yes
- Casualties: 9–12 dead 30–69 injured

The 1995 Gulf of Aqaba earthquake (also known as Nuweiba earthquake) occurred on November 22 at 06:15 local time (04:15 UTC) and registered 7.3 on the M_{w} scale. The epicenter was located in the central segment of the Gulf of Aqaba, the narrow body of water that separates Egypt's Sinai Peninsula from the western border of Saudi Arabia. At least 8 people were killed and 30 were injured in the meizoseismal area.

The earthquake occurred along the Dead Sea Transform (DST) fault system, an active tectonic plate boundary with seismicity that is characterized by long-running quiescent periods with occasional large and damaging earthquakes, along with intermittent earthquake swarms. It was the strongest tectonic event in the area for many decades and caused injuries, damage, and deaths throughout the Levant and is also thought to have remotely triggered a series of small to moderate earthquakes 500 kilometers (310 mi) to the north of the epicenter. In the aftermath of the quake, several field investigations set out to determine the extent of any surface faulting, and the distribution of aftershocks was analyzed.

== Tectonic setting ==
The Gulf of Aqaba is situated along the southern portion of the Dead Sea Transform (DST) fault zone, a 1,000 km (620 mi) transform fault that forms the barrier between the African plate and the Arabian plate (Arabian-Nubian Shield). The left-lateral strike-slip fault connects the spreading center that forms the Red Sea in the south with the East Anatolian Fault in Turkey in the north. Although there is much that is not known about the DST, it is accepted that its transform motion began around 12–18 million years ago. Geologist A. M. Quennell, who is credited with first recognizing the movement along the fault in 1958, estimated the total displacement to be 107 kilometers (66 mi) while a similar study that included more regional influences resulted in an estimated slip of 100 kilometers (62 mi). That broader kinematic model translates into a slip rate of 8–10 mm/year for the portion of the fault south of the Dead Sea.

Along the length of the Dead Sea Transform (also known as the Levantine fault) there are several pull-apart basins that have resulted in the formation of the Dead Sea as well as the Gulf of Aqaba. The 180 km (110 mi) gulf comprises three distinct pull-apart basins that were formed by individual segments of the fault and are known as (from north to south) the Elat Deep, Aragonese Deep, and the Dakar Deep. At 25 km (16 mi) wide, the gulf is relatively narrow, but is up to 1,800 meters (5,900 ft) deep, with the nearby mountains near 2,600 meters (8,500 ft) in height. This difference in elevation suggests that the tectonic activity outpaces the erosive processes in the area, but the background seismicity is infrequent and is marked by earthquake swarms.

== Stress triggering ==
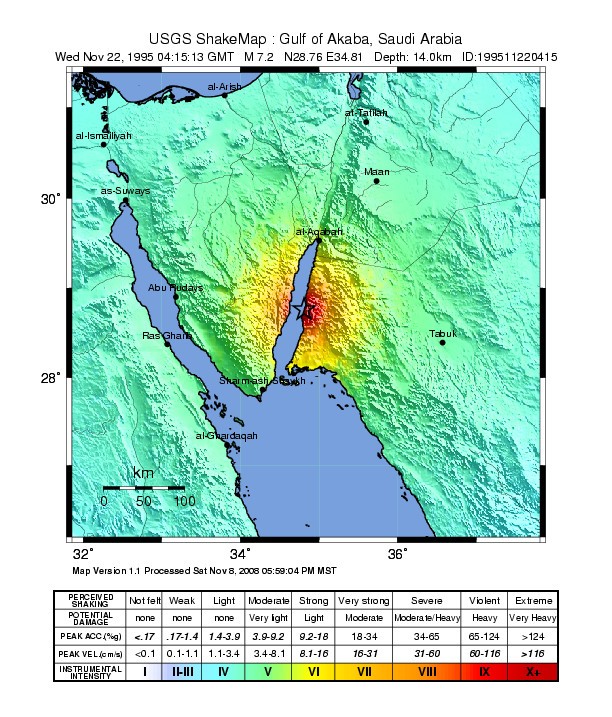
USGS shakemap showing the intensity of the 1995 Gulf of Aqaba earthquake

The earthquake was the largest event to occur on along the DST during the 20th century and was felt up to 600 km (370 mi) away. The period of aftershocks carried on for over a year with many exceeding magnitude 5. Within several hours of the mainshock a number of small earthquakes occurred along the DST 500 km (310 mi) north of the epicenter. Analysis of these earthquakes suggest that they may have been remotely triggered by the Gulf of Aqaba mainshock. Much attention has been given to remotely triggered earthquakes since the 1992 Landers earthquake in southern California.

The Dead Sea fault system runs from the Red Sea north to a triple junction in south-central Turkey and consists of a main fault and several secondary faults. The fault system is at its widest and deepest in the gulf where a transition from proto-oceanic rifting to transform faulting occurs. Moving northward through Lebanon and Syria, where the DST is known as the Yammouneh fault, the trace follows a restraining bend and splits into several strands that include the Serghaya and Rachaya faults. These strands are believed to be the source of the Near East earthquakes of 1759. The increased seismic activity following the Aqaba earthquake was detected by the Syrian National Seismic Network (SNSN) and occurred in the area of the Serghaya and Rachaya faults within a 25 km × 25 km (16 mi × 16 mi) area near the restraining bend in southwest Syria. The SNSN consists of twenty vertical-component seismometers, but only nine instruments recorded the swarm.

This small area in southwest Syria situated 500 km north of the Gulf of Aqaba mainshock had almost no activity during the two previous months then, beginning two hours and 47 minutes after the event, a swarm of 21 small earthquakes occurred. The average background seismicity was .5 to 1 events per day preceding November 22, and during the swarm 21 small earthquakes with a peak magnitude of (M_{d} = 3.7) were recorded in three and a half hours. Randa Mohamad (from the Syrian National Seismological Center) and other seismologists determined that the abrupt increase of activity was due to remote earthquake triggering from the Gulf of Aqaba mainshock, and reported the results of their investigation in a journal published by the Seismological Society of America.

== Damage ==
The epicenter was located 60 kilometers (37 mi) south of the head of the Gulf of Aqaba where the countries of Egypt, Israel, Jordan, and Saudi Arabia converge. Damage to buildings occurred in the coastal cities of Eilat, Israel and Aqaba, Jordan and a small tsunami was observed by witnesses there. Farther down the coast and closer to the epicenter in the Egyptian city of Nuweiba several well-built, modern, concrete reinforced homes were completely destroyed.

The earthquake's effects were felt as far north as Lebanon and Syria and it was the strongest event in the Jordan Rift Valley since the 1927 Jericho earthquake which was centered near the Dead Sea. The heaviest damage occurred in the resort town of Eilat where seven hotels and 50 other buildings were damaged, and cracks formed in the sidewalks. Fifteen people were treated there for injuries or shock and one man died of a heart attack in Aqaba. In Saudi Arabia two women were reported dead and five deaths were reported in Egypt, with three of them occurring in the gulf resort town of Nuweiba. Eight buildings collapsed in Cairo where, just several years before, the much smaller 1992 Cairo earthquake had a much more destructive impact. One person was killed and two were injured slightly at Al-Bad', Saudi Arabia and damage was reported there as well as the towns of Al-'Ula and Haql. In Eilat, Israel, one person died of a heart attack, several people were injured and property damage, power cuts and liquefaction was observed. In Jerusalem, some damage was also observed.

== Past events ==
The Gulf of Aqaba lies between the Sinai Peninsula and the Arabian Peninsula, both mostly desert regions with very few permanent settlements. The seismologists who work with historical events gather macroseismic data from written records from cities that may not have been anywhere near the epicentral area. This can result in the mislocation of events when significant damage was reported in a particular location which were not actually where the earthquake occurred. The records of these events have been influenced by the distribution of the population (where the people were) and this has caused difficulty in creating a complete and accurate index of historical events. Several studies in the 80s and 90s indicate that there were two or possibly three large earthquakes in the region in the last 2000 years with magnitudes estimated to be 6.5–7.0 based on macroseismic data.

The countries surrounding the gulf have been actively monitoring the seismicity there since the 1980s and have found a consistent low level of activity, but a primary characteristic of the activity is that there are multiple sequences of earthquake swarms. Three swarm events, beginning in the north and ending in the south gulf, have been observed beginning in 1983 when more than 1,000 events occurred over a three-month period near the northeastern boundary of the Elat Deep (in the northern gulf) with the largest three events approaching 5 on the Richter magnitude scale. A less pronounced swarm occurred in 1990 with the largest event reaching 4.3 in the central gulf near the Elat Deep and the Arogonese Deep. The last significant swarm happened in 1993 in the southwestern Arogonese Deep (in the southern gulf) with the highest magnitude of 6.1 and more than 300 larger than magnitude 3 in the following weeks.

== Aftermath ==
During several independent field studies cracks and other ground deformations were observed on both the Egyptian and Saudi Arabian sides of the gulf. During a field survey that was done there in 1996, a series of cracks were discovered between 28°35' N and 29°05' N on the Saudi Arabian coast. A field investigation was also done in Egypt in 1996 by seismologist Yann Klinger and others along with the Egyptian Geological Survey and Mining Authority. The most dramatic ground ruptures found were north of Nuweiba along a coastal road.

The countries surrounding the gulf (Egypt, Israel, Jordan, and Saudi Arabia) operate their own seismic networks and during the months that followed the main event, fourteen temporary and permanent stations recorded thousands of aftershocks. Klinger acquired data on approximately 1,000 aftershocks via the European-Mediterranean Seismological Center and the agencies of each country. The data was filtered to include only those aftershocks within 150 km (93 mi) of the epicenter. Data from four stations from the Institute for Petroleum Research and Geophysics of Israel plus seven stations from Jordan's Natural Resource Authority recorded aftershocks in the epicentral area that met the restriction. It was found that the aftershocks were arranged with a north–south alignment over a length of 70 km (43 mi) and that was expected from an earthquake of such magnitude. The group of aftershocks were bunched in two distinct clusters, with one in the north and one further south.

== See also ==
- List of earthquakes in 1995
- List of earthquakes in Egypt
- List of earthquakes in Saudi Arabia
- List of earthquakes in the Levant
