= Palestina, Chocó =

Palestina
- Populated center
- Location in Chocó and Colombia Palestina (Colombia)
- Coordinates: 4°9′45.2″N 77°8′8.0″W
- Country: Colombia
- Department: Chocó
- Municipality: Litoral del San Juan Municipality
- Elevation: 98 ft (30 m)

Population (2005)
  - Total: 132
- Time zone: UTC-5 (Colombia Standard Time)

Palestina is a populated center of Colombia in Litoral del San Juan Municipality, Chocó Department in Colombia.

== Climate ==
Palestina has a very wet tropical rainforest climate (Af).

Climate data for Palestina
| Month | Jan | Feb | Mar | Apr | May | Jun | Jul | Aug | Sep | Oct | Nov | Dec | Year |
|---|---|---|---|---|---|---|---|---|---|---|---|---|---|
| Mean daily maximum °C (°F) | 30.0 (86.0) | 29.9 (85.8) | 30.3 (86.5) | 30.2 (86.4) | 30.1 (86.2) | 29.8 (85.6) | 30.0 (86.0) | 29.9 (85.8) | 29.6 (85.3) | 29.2 (84.6) | 29.4 (84.9) | 29.5 (85.1) | 29.8 (85.7) |
| Daily mean °C (°F) | 26.4 (79.5) | 26.3 (79.3) | 26.6 (79.9) | 26.6 (79.9) | 26.6 (79.9) | 26.3 (79.3) | 26.5 (79.7) | 26.4 (79.5) | 26.3 (79.3) | 25.9 (78.6) | 26.1 (79.0) | 26.1 (79.0) | 26.3 (79.4) |
| Mean daily minimum °C (°F) | 22.9 (73.2) | 22.7 (72.9) | 23.0 (73.4) | 23.1 (73.6) | 23.1 (73.6) | 22.9 (73.2) | 23.0 (73.4) | 22.9 (73.2) | 23.0 (73.4) | 22.7 (72.9) | 22.8 (73.0) | 22.8 (73.0) | 22.9 (73.2) |
| Average rainfall mm (inches) | 442.2 (17.41) | 311.0 (12.24) | 349.1 (13.74) | 483.3 (19.03) | 650.8 (25.62) | 609.3 (23.99) | 634.7 (24.99) | 755.1 (29.73) | 807.9 (31.81) | 761.4 (29.98) | 705.5 (27.78) | 603.5 (23.76) | 7,113.8 (280.08) |
| Average rainy days | 17 | 13 | 16 | 17 | 19 | 19 | 22 | 22 | 21 | 21 | 19 | 19 | 225 |
