= 1995 Chiapas earthquake =

Earthquake in Mexico

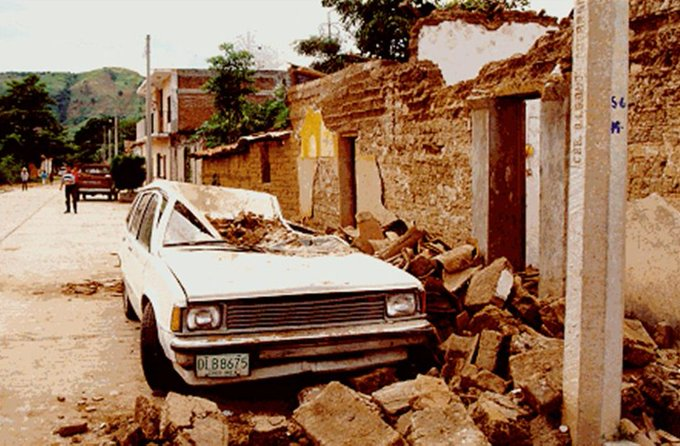
- Vehicle damaged by falling debris

- Location within Mexico
- UTC time: 1995-10-21 02:38:57
- ISC event: 79337
- USGS-ANSS: ComCat
- Local date: October 20, 1995
- Local time: 20:38
- Magnitude: 7.2 M_{w} 6.5 M_{L}
- Depth: 159.3 km (99.0 mi)
- Epicenter: 16.840°N 93.469°W
- Type: Oblique-slip
- Areas affected: Mexico
- Max. intensity: MMI VI (Strong)
- Casualties: 70 injured

The 1995 Chiapas earthquake occurred on October 20 at 20:38 local time. The epicenter was located in Ocozocoautla de Espinosa, in the state of Chiapas, Mexico, near Tuxtla Gutiérrez. It had a magnitude of M_{w} 7.2, or M_{L} 6.5. Building damage was reported. Around 70 people were reported injured. In Tuxtla Gutiérrez, telephone and electricity services were momentarily interrupted. This earthquake could be felt strongly in Mexico City and in many parts of southern Mexico. It could also be felt in Guatemala and El Salvador. The centroid mechanism is of thrust faulting with a small strike-slip component. The rupture of this earthquake propagated from NW to SE over a distance of about 30 km. The duration of the rupture was about 17 seconds. The earthquake was resulted from the internal deformation of the Cocos plate, which is subducting beneath the North American plate.
