= Geology of Egypt =

The geology of Egypt includes rocks from Archaean - early Proterozoic times onwards. These oldest rocks are found as inliers in Egypt’s Western Desert. In contrast, the rocks of the Eastern Desert are largely late Proterozoic in age. Throughout the country this older basement is overlain by Palaeozoic sedimentary rocks. Cretaceous rocks occur commonly whilst sediments indicative of repeated marine transgression and regression are characteristic of the Cenozoic Era.

== Economic geology ==
While gold has been mined since Pharaonic times, it is not of sufficient quality to be economically viable. Copper is another resource available, but is also of a poor grade. There is iron located in the Western Desert, and the railway linking the mines to a city near Cairo was restored in the early 1990s. Black sand placers, which are deposits of minerals formed by gravity separation due to sedimentary processes, that are located along the Mediterranean coast contain ilmenite, hematite, magnetite, zircon, garnet, and monazite. Egypt leads Africa in the extraction of both talc and gypsum. It is second in salt production, third for phosphate and vermiculite, and fourth for iron ore.

Egypt also extracts oil, and is the largest non-OPEC producer of oil in Africa. Additionally, Egypt also produces the second most natural gas in Africa. Hydrocarbon extraction accounts for 12% of Egypt's GDP. About 90% percent of Egypt's petroleum production comes from oil wells in the Gulf of Suez. Crude oil has also been discovered in the Western Desert.

== See also ==
- Arabian-Nubian Shield
- Gulf of Suez Rift
