= 1995 Timor earthquake =

1995 earthquake in Southeast Asia

- Location within Indonesia
- UTC time: 1995-05-14 11:33:18
- ISC event: 103774
- USGS-ANSS: ComCat
- Local date: 14 May 1995
- Magnitude: M_{w} 6.9
- Depth: 12.9 km (8 mi)
- Epicenter: 8.363°S 124.997°E
- Type: Normal
- Max. intensity: MMI VIII (Severe)
- Casualties: 11 missing, 19 injured

An earthquake measuring 6.9 on the moment magnitude scale struck between Flores and Timor on 14 May 1995. The shock centered in the Ombai Strait was associated with coastal subsidence and a tsunami on Timor. A 4 m (13 ft) wave inundated up to 120 m (390 ft) inland and left 19 people injured and 11 missing. At Dili, a 1.5 m (4 ft 11 in) tsunami destroyed homes and damaged 40 boats. Significant damage was also reported in Maliana and Maubara while landslides affected the epicenter region. Subsidence was observed from Dili to Maboura; subsidence at Marinir may have been responsible for the 4 m (13 ft) tsunami run-up. Furthermore, a submarine landslide or one occurring near the sea may have caused the tsunami. There were no eyewitness account of the tsunami waves following the earthquake.
