= 1995 Dinar earthquake =

Earthquake in southwest Turkey

- Location within Turkey
- UTC time: 1995-10-01 15:57:12
- ISC event: 72858
- USGS-ANSS: ComCat
- Local date: October 1, 1995
- Local time: 15:57:12
- Magnitude: 6.2 M_{w}
- Depth: 33 kilometers (21 mi)
- Epicenter: 38.063°N 30.134°E
- Areas affected: Dinar (District), Afyonkarahisar, Turkey
- Total damage: 4,500 or 5100 buildings damaged
- Max. intensity: MMI VIII (Severe)
- Casualties: 90 dead, 200+ injured

The 1995 Dinar earthquake occurred on 1 October in Dinar (District), Afyonkarahisar, Turkey. It had an M_{w} magnitude of 6.2 with an epicenter close to the Dinar-Çivril fault.

The earthquake occurred at a time of political instability in Turkey, with large strikes by public sector workers taking place just 11 days earlier. The disaster was preceded by a number of smaller earthquakes of up to 5.1 magnitude, the last of which had occurred on 26 September 1995. This resulted in a number of residents deciding to sleep outside their homes and possibly resulted in less deaths and injuries in the 1 October quake. When the quake occurred, 90 people were killed and more than 200 injured in the disaster.

In total, 2,473 homes suffered major damage, 1,218 moderate damage and 2,076 slight damage. The Turkish government responded by constructing 5,000 new homes for those affected by the disaster.

== Tectonic setting and seismic sequence ==
On the western flank of the Isparta Angle—where the Anatolian microplate pivots between the Hellenic and Cyprus Arcs—the NW–SE-trending Dinar Fault accommodates southwest‐directed extension and minor lateral slip. Geological mapping shows a 10 km surface rupture divided into three segments (the Dinar, central and Yapagli ruptures), with vertical displacements up to 25–30 cm and a small graben (sunken block) formed in places; where the fault bends, field measurements record centimetre-scale lateral offsets, indicating a minor strike-slip component. Historical sources reveal that the ancient town of Apemea (modern Dinar) was devastated by quakes in 400 BC, 88 BC and AD 53, and more recently by events in 1875 and 1925—though those ruptured neighbouring strands rather than the Dinar Fault itself.

In the six days before the mainshock, a distinctive foreshock sequence began with a magnitude 4.0 tremor on 25 September, followed by a 4.5 event two days before the main rupture, and a total of 35 foreshocks greater than or equal to 3.0 recorded at ITU's Cine station (a permanent short‐period analogue seismograph operated by Istanbul Technical University's Kandilli Observatory and Earthquake Research Institute); activity quietened about 51 hours before the mainshock, matching recognised precursor patterns for moderate quakes. The mainshock, at 15:57 GMT on 1 October, comprised two sub-events on the same fault plane: the first at about 8 km depth (Mw 5.7) and the second—about four times more energetic—at roughly 12 km depth (Mw 6.1), giving a combined seismic moment of 2.0 × 10^{18} Nm (equivalent to Mw 6.2). Inversion of broad-band P-waves shows the rupture propagated north-westward between these depths. Strong-motion records in the epicentral area register peak horizontal accelerations of about 0.33 g—assigned intensity IX (MSK)—and geological amplification in the thick, water-saturated Quaternary alluvium east of the fault markedly increased damage. In total, 92 people were killed, 4,340 buildings were destroyed and a further 10,000 damaged, illustrating the hazard posed by soft-sediment basins.

== See also ==
- List of earthquakes in 1995
- List of earthquakes in Turkey
