= Nogliki =

Nogliki Ноглики
- Urban-type settlement
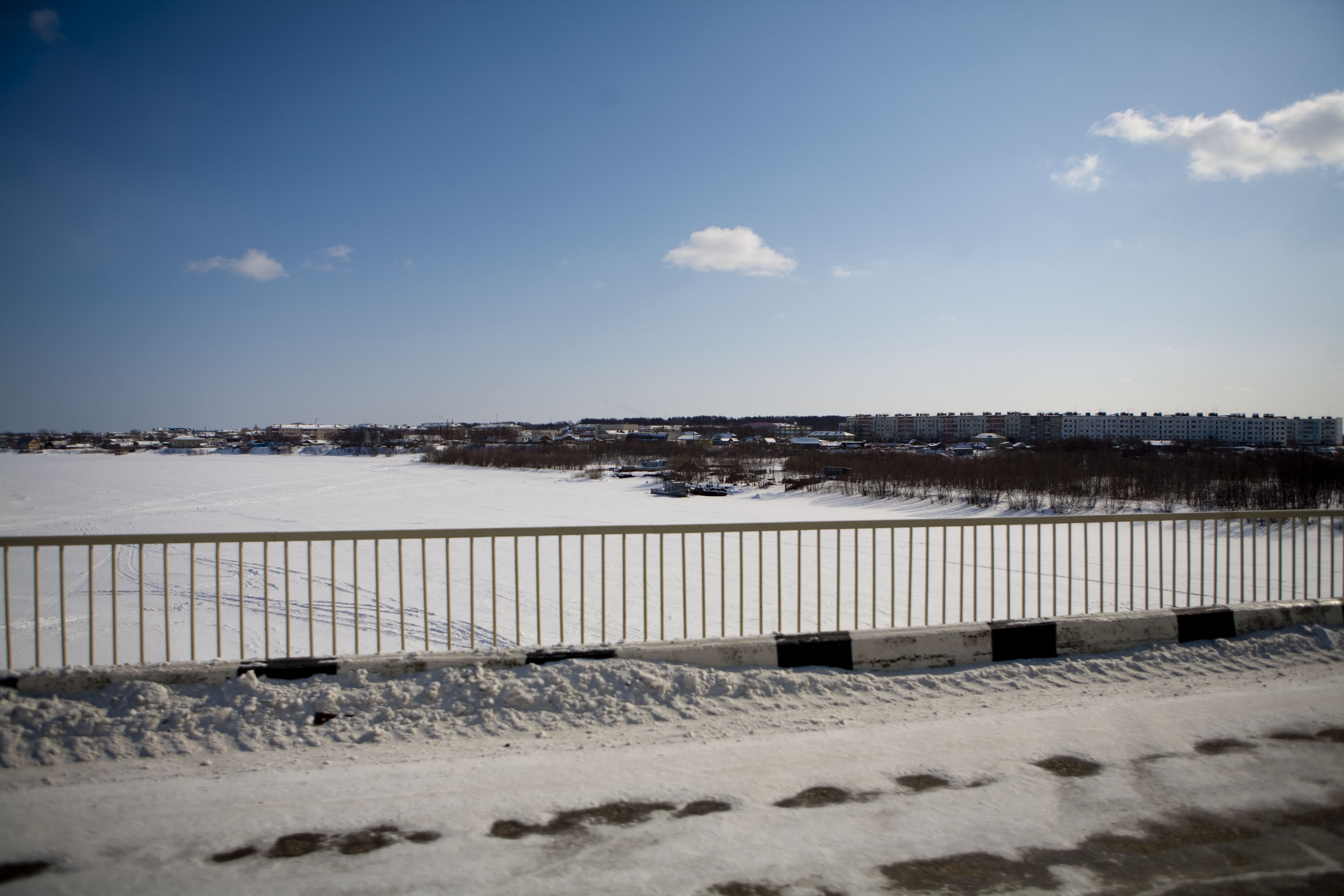
- View of Nogliki from the bridge

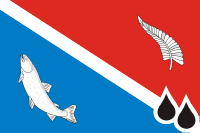
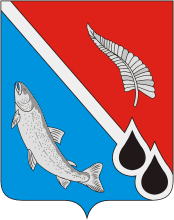
- Flag Coat of arms
- Interactive map of Nogliki
- Location of Nogliki Nogliki (Sakhalin Oblast)
- Coordinates: 51°48′45″N 143°10′00″E
- Country: Russia
- Federal subject: Sakhalin Oblast
- Administrative district: Nogliksky District
- Founded: late 1940s
- Urban-type settlement status since: 1960
- Elevation: 10 m (33 ft)

Population (2010 Census)
  - Total: 10,231
  - Estimate (2025): 10,193 (−0.4%)

Administrative status
  - Capital of: Nogliksky District

Municipal status
  - Urban okrug: Nogliksky Urban Okrug
  - Capital of: Nogliksky Urban Okrug
- Time zone: UTC+11 (MSK+8)
- Postal code: 694450
- Dialing code: +7 42444
- OKTMO ID: 64732000051

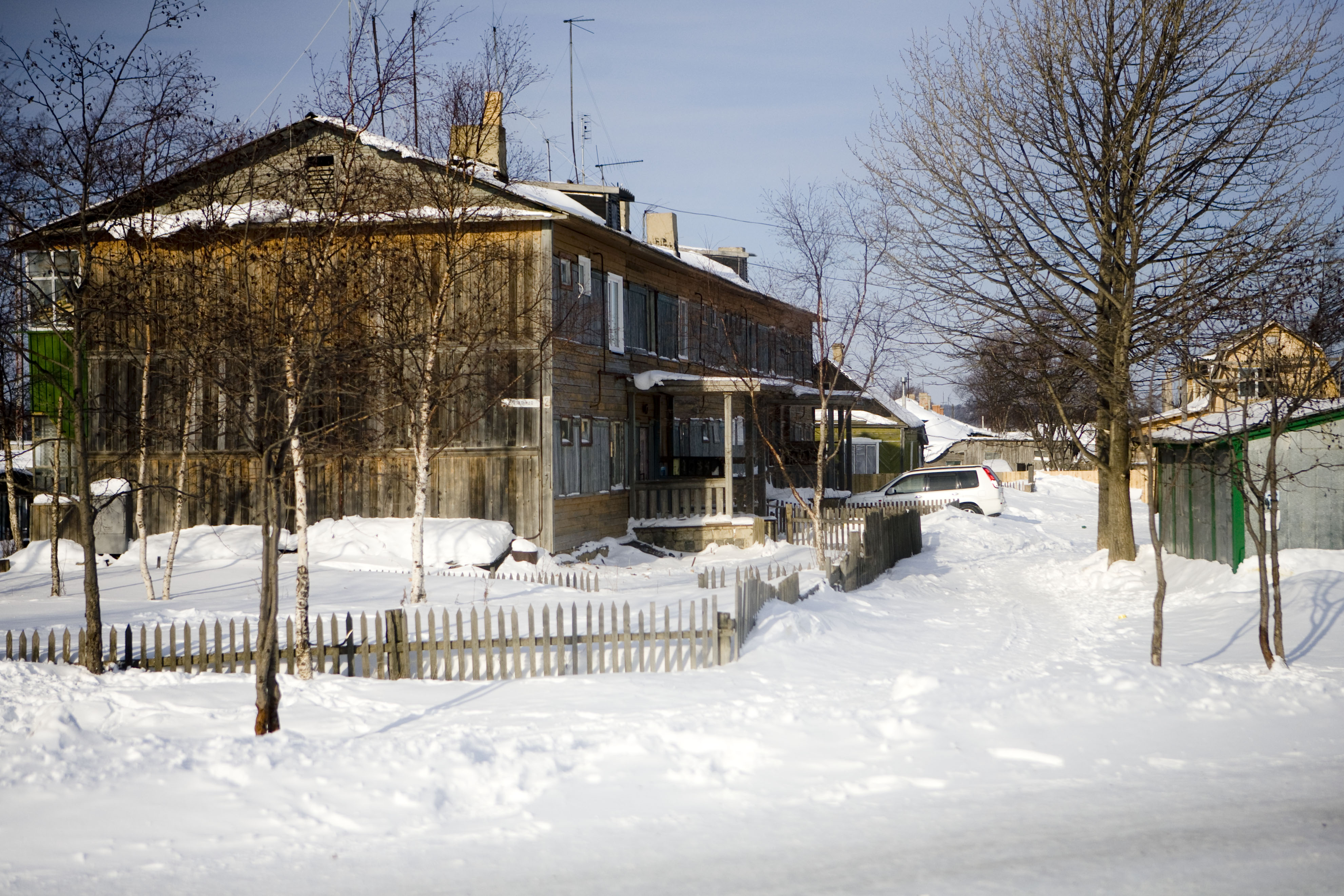
A typical home in Nogliki

Nogliki (Russian: Ноглики) is an urban locality (an urban-type settlement) and the administrative center of Nogliksky District of Sakhalin Oblast, Russia, located near the eastern coast of Sakhalin Island, about 6 kilometers (3.7 mi) inland from the Sea of Okhotsk shoreline and about 600 kilometers (370 mi) north of Yuzhno-Sakhalinsk. Population: 10,231 (2010 census); 10,729 (2002 census); 11,546 (1989 Soviet census).

== History ==
It was founded in the late 1940s with the beginnings of petroleum production in the area. It was granted urban-type settlement status in 1960.

Some believe that this ethnonym owes its origin to the self-name of one of the clans of the Sakhalin Nivkhs “Noglan”, and the historical name of their camp is called “Noglvo”, or in the Russian version of “Nogliki”. Others believe that in its first principle it is a hydronym, and connect the appearance of the name of the settlement with the small river Nogliki - the right tributary of the Imchin river, which flows, in turn, into the Tym river in its lowest reaches. In modern pronunciation, these names, of course, are a distortion of the original, for the Nivkhs called the Nogly-ngi river, and their camp, which was once located on the site of the present regional center, was called Nogl-in. The name of the river is associated with numerous surface oil manifestations in its basin and means “smelling river”; from the words "nogla" - odorous and "and" - the river.

== Climate ==
The climate is harsh subarctic (Köppen Dfc), with long, frigid winters only marginally moderated by the ocean alongside short, mild summers. Nogliki during winter lies on the cold eastern flank of the Siberian High, producing very cold temperatures as the frigid air is advected southwards. Over the course of the year Nogliki experiences a massive latitude anomaly in relation to other coastal climates on similar latitudes.

Climate data for Nogliki (1948–2011)
Month	Jan	Feb	Mar	Apr	May	Jun	Jul	Aug	Sep	Oct	Nov	Dec	Year
Record high °C (°F)	2.2 (36.0)	3.5 (38.3)	11.9 (53.4)	18.2 (64.8)	29.9 (85.8)	32.8 (91.0)	33.0 (91.4)	33.9 (93.0)	28.4 (83.1)	22.2 (72.0)	11.4 (52.5)	8.9 (48.0)	33.9 (93.0)
Mean daily maximum °C (°F)	−13.6 (7.5)	−10.9 (12.4)	−5.0 (23.0)	2.1 (35.8)	8.6 (47.5)	15.1 (59.2)	18.3 (64.9)	19.6 (67.3)	15.7 (60.3)	7.6 (45.7)	−3.5 (25.7)	−11.4 (11.5)	3.4 (38.1)
Daily mean °C (°F)	−18.2 (−0.8)	−16.0 (3.2)	−10.0 (14.0)	−1.8 (28.8)	3.8 (38.8)	9.5 (49.1)	13.2 (55.8)	14.7 (58.5)	10.7 (51.3)	3.2 (37.8)	−7.7 (18.1)	−15.7 (3.7)	−1.4 (29.5)
Mean daily minimum °C (°F)	−23.6 (−10.5)	−22.3 (−8.1)	−16.7 (1.9)	−6.6 (20.1)	−0.6 (30.9)	4.2 (39.6)	8.6 (47.5)	10.1 (50.2)	5.8 (42.4)	−1.6 (29.1)	−12.6 (9.3)	−20.9 (−5.6)	−6.5 (20.3)
Record low °C (°F)	−40.0 (−40.0)	−42.2 (−44.0)	−37.8 (−36.0)	−26.1 (−15.0)	−10.0 (14.0)	−11.0 (12.2)	0.0 (32.0)	−1.0 (30.2)	−4.0 (24.8)	−20.0 (−4.0)	−33.9 (−29.0)	−41.1 (−42.0)	−42.2 (−44.0)
Average precipitation mm (inches)	34.9 (1.37)	41.8 (1.65)	34.7 (1.37)	45.0 (1.77)	48.1 (1.89)	58.6 (2.31)	63.5 (2.50)	99.6 (3.92)	86.3 (3.40)	82.5 (3.25)	36.6 (1.44)	38.2 (1.50)	669.8 (26.37)
Average relative humidity (%)	77.9	73.9	76.5	79.5	80.4	80.5	85.6	85.3	80.8	76.5	75.7	76.6	79.1

== Administrative and municipal status ==
Within the framework of administrative divisions, Nogliki serves as the administrative center of Nogliksky District and is subordinated to it. As a municipal division, the urban-type settlement of Nogliki and eleven rural localities of Nogliksky District are incorporated as Nogliksky Urban Okrug.

== Economy and transportation ==
Nogliki is a supplier for the oil fields Sakhalin I and Sakhalin II, located in the Pacific Ocean off the coast to the northeast. There is also some logging activity in the area around the settlement. The settlement is also the northern terminus of the Sakhalin Rail Network, with the narrow-gauge line reaching the settlement in 1978. Another railway connecting Nogliki with the town of Okha further to the north was completed in 1953; however, this line closed in to passenger traffic in the 1980s, with only occasional goods traffic thereafter.

An airport servicing the nearby oil and gas developments opened in September 2007.
