= 1992 Cairo earthquake =

Magnitude 5.8 earthquake in Egypt

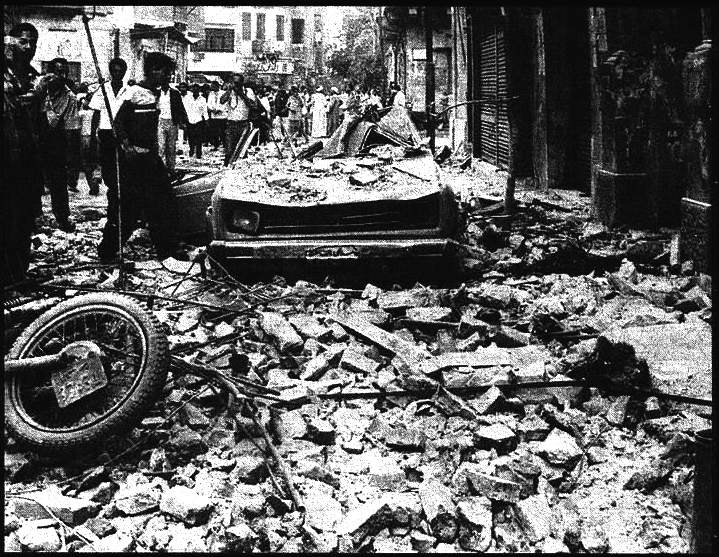
- Rubble from falling parapets litters a Cairo street in the aftermath of the 1992 Dahshur (Egypt) Earthquake.

- UTC time: 1992-10-12 13:09:55
- ISC event: 267175
- USGS-ANSS: ComCat
- Local date: 12 October 1992
- Local time: 3:09:55 pm EET
- Magnitude: 5.8 mb
- Depth: 22 km (14 mi)
- Epicenter: 29.778°N 31.144°E
- Type: Normal
- Areas affected: Greater Cairo, the Delta, northern Upper Egypt
- Max. intensity: MMI VIII (Severe)
- Casualties: 561 dead, 12,392 injured

The 1992 Cairo earthquake, also known as the Dahshur earthquake, occurred at 15:09 local time (13:09 UTC) on 12 October, with an epicenter in the Western Desert near Dahshur, Giza, 35 km (22 mi) south of Egypt's capital city, Cairo. The earthquake had a magnitude of either 5.8 or 5.9, but was unusually destructive for its size, causing 561 deaths and injuring 12,392 people. It also made "over half a million people homeless", destroying or significantly damaging "129,000 residential buildings and houses" in tens of cities and villages across 16 governorates, in Greater Cairo, the Delta, and northern Upper Egypt. It was the most damaging seismic event to affect Egypt since 1847.

== Geology ==
Cairo sits within a diffuse zone of faulting that transfers extension from the Gulf of Suez Rift to the Manzala rift beneath the Nile Delta.

== Damage ==
More than 129,000 residential buildings and houses were affected by the earthquake across 17 of Egypt’s 27 governorates, disproportionately affecting heavily populated governorates near to the epicentre, with Giza, where the epicentre was, seeing over two fifths of the damage.

Over 12,000 residential buildings and houses (12%) collapsed or were so heavily damaged, they were identified to be demolished, while a further 28,000 buildings (25%), required significant repairs or partial demolition (usually of a floor or more), and the remaining two thirds were found to need minor repair. Some 216 mosques and 350 schools were badly damaged.

Around 40,000 of the affected buildings were in the capital, Cairo, representing over one third of all buildings. The areas of greatest damage were in the historic neighbourhoods of Historic Cairo, Old Cairo and Boulaq. Damage was reported to have affected 212 out of a total of 560 historical monuments. Most of the severe damage was confined to older masonry structures and particularly those built of adobe. The exception was a modern reinforced concrete building in Heliopolis, killing 79 people. Fortunately, many of the inhabitants were outside of the building at the time of the event. It was later revealed that many additional stories were added to the building illegally and the ground floor/basement had been opened up to accommodate community amenities, including a laundry.

The villages of Giza, were some of the worse hit as they were very close to the epicentre, where 5292 houses collapsed or were damaged beyond repair, and 12,700 needed significant repair, while three villages were almost entirely levelled in Markaz Al-Ayyat. Liquefaction was reported from areas near the epicenter.

The third most affected governorate was Fayoum, where villages in its north-east were also close to the epicentre, especially in Markaz Tamiya where heavy damage was sustained in 5135 houses in the villages of Al-Rawda, Manshiyat Al-Gamal, Qasr Rashwan and Fanous.

The high number of deaths and injuries (561 and 12,392 respectively) was partly due to the amount of panic caused by the earthquake in Cairo itself. A large block fell from the Great Pyramid of Giza.

== Earthquake characteristics ==
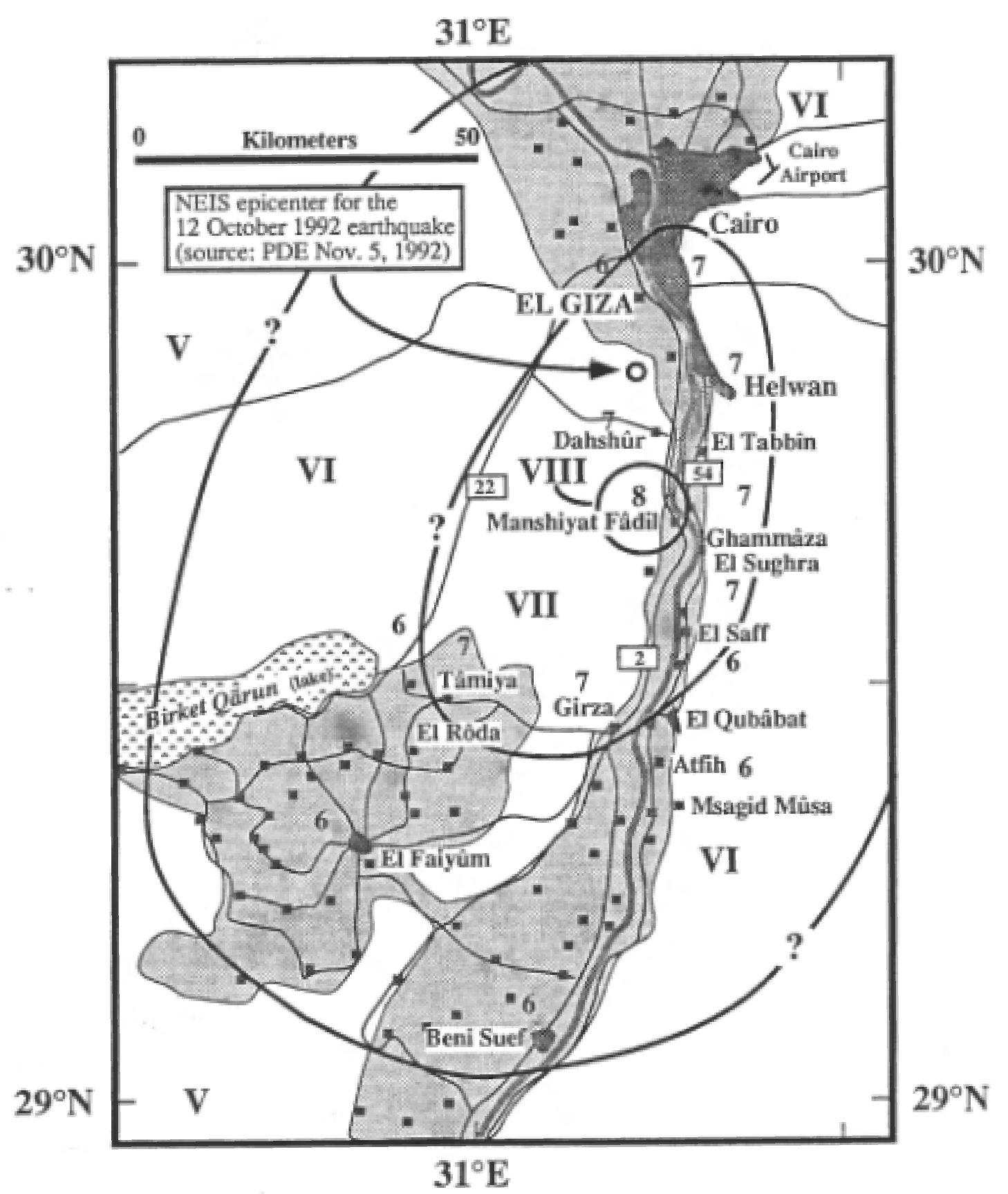
Isoseismal map for the 1992 Cairo earthquake

The earthquake was felt throughout most of northern Egypt, in Alexandria, Port Said and as far south as Asyut, and in southern Israel. The calculated focal mechanism suggests that this event originated on a WNW-ESE or W-E trending normal fault with a small strike-slip component. The aftershocks extended about 11 km (6.8 mi) to the south-east of the main shock epicentre, indicating unidirectional rupture propagation. The estimated fault rupture length was also 11 km (6.8 mi). The earthquake consisted of two sub-events, the second located about 27 km (17 mi) south-east of the first.

== Response ==
The government was criticized for its lack of action. Islamic fundamentalist groups such as the Muslim Brotherhood stepped in to provide aid.

== See also ==
- List of earthquakes in 1992
- List of earthquakes in Egypt
- List of earthquakes in the Levant
