= Tyuleny Island (Sea of Okhotsk) =

Coordinates: 48°30′N 144°39′E

Tyuleny Тюлений
- Island
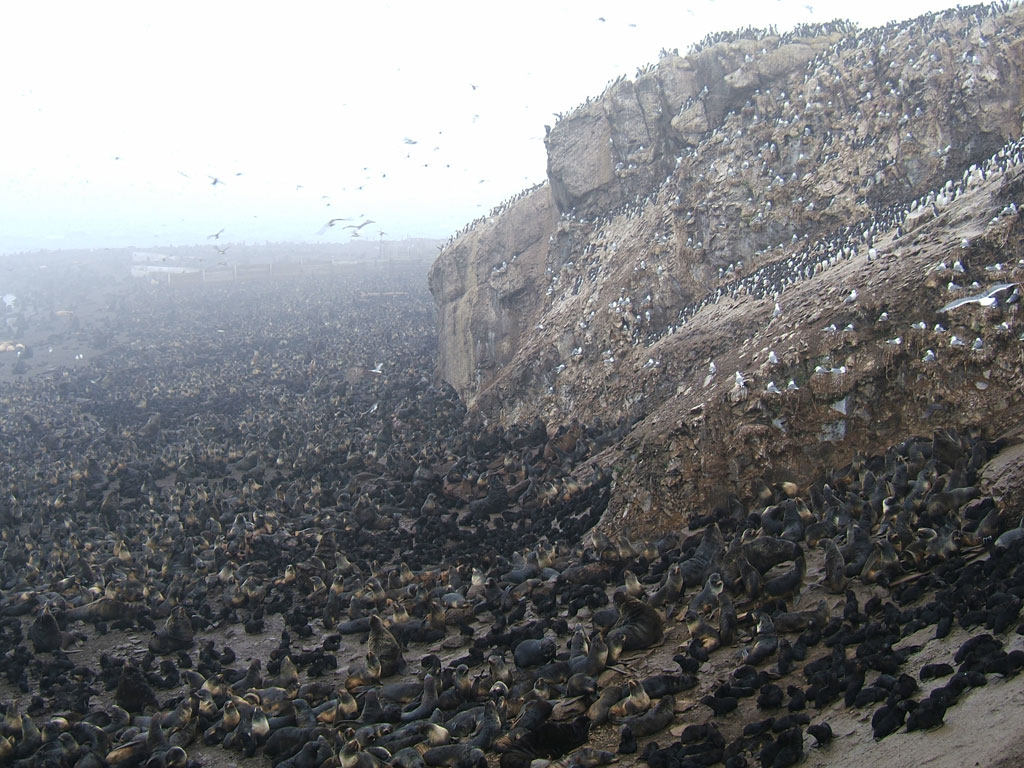
- Northern fur seal rookery on the Island beside a bird colony.

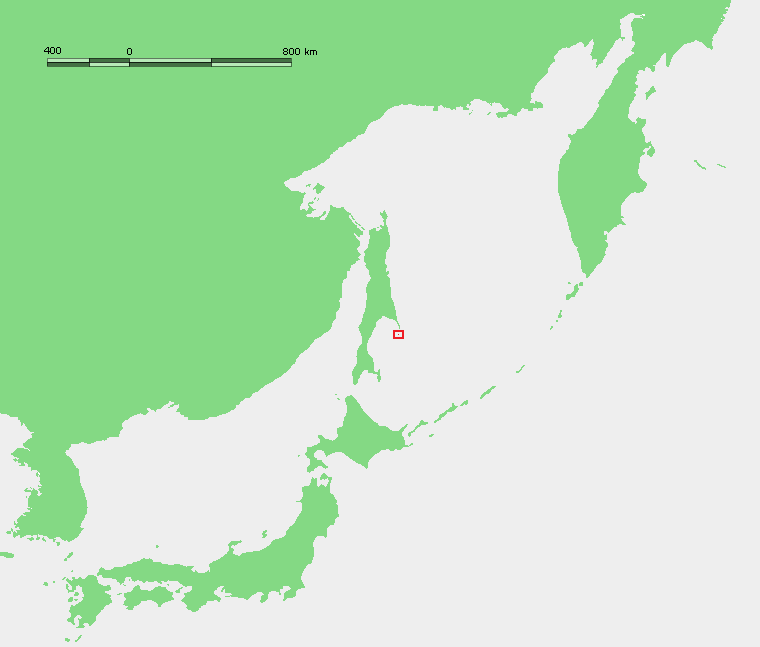
- Location of Tyuleny Island in the Sea of Okhotsk.
- Country: Russian Federation
- Federal subject: Sakhalin Oblast
- Elevation: 18 m (59 ft)

Tyuleny Island (Ostrov Tyuleniy) is a small uninhabited island in the Sea of Okhotsk, to the east of Russia's Sakhalin Island, in Northeast Asia. It is also known by its Japanese name 海豹島 (Kaihyo Island) and has two widely used spelling alternatives: Tuleny and Tyuleniy.

== Geography ==
Tyuleny Island is located off the eastern side of the Gulf of Patience, about 12 kilometers southwest of Cape Patience (Sakhalin Island).

The island is less than 700 meters long and 40–90 meters wide, with a total area of 0.053 km^{2}. It contains sandy beaches and features a 18-meter-high rock with cliffs and a large plateau on the top. Large sandy spits are found on the south and north of the island.

Tyuleny used to be connected to the Cape Patience in the geological past. The strait between them formed due to tectonic processes and coastal abrasion. The island consisting of sedimentary and clastic rocks from Late Cretaceous is gradually degrading due to erosion, precipitation and aggressive organic matter from sea birds.

The island is surrounded by reefs and has no fresh water.

The island is under the administration of Sakhalin Oblast in the Russian Far East District.

== Fauna and flora ==
The island is famous for its huge reproductive rookery of northern fur seals. Steller sea lions also breed there, and spotted seals often rest on the island.

Tyuleny is also one of the important bird areas of the Russian Far East. At least 143 bird species were observed on the island and 12 of them confirmed to be breeding. There is a huge colony of common guillemots with more than 145 000 birds breeding on a plateau and cliffs, with a density of up to 20 breeding plots per 1 m^{2}. Other breeding species are black-legged kittiwake, slaty-backed gull, Brünnich’s guillemot, ancient murrelet, crested auklet, parakeet auklet, rhinoceros auklet, tufted puffin, northern fulmar, black-backed white wagtail and large-billed crow. Birds with aberrant coloration can also be found on the island. Notably, several observed passerine species belong to subspecies native to Kamchatka rather than the geographically closest Sakhalin.

In 2014, there was a fox on the island, which brought huge damage to the local colony of rhinoceros auklets.

Current island vegetation is rather scarce and consists of crustose lichens, mosses and seaside ragwort (Senecio pseudoarnica). However, plant diversity was richer in the past. Cliff slopes and several plots on the rock were covered by thickets of Leymus. Additionally, angelica (Angelica viridiflora), Mertensia, saltbush, bluegrass, chickweed and other herbaceous plants could be found on the island.

== Viruses ==
Tyuleny Island is known as the source of arboviruses isolated from Ixodes uriae ticks that are abundant in the local seabird colony. These viruses include Tyuleniy virus (TYUV), Sakhalin virus, (SAKV), Paramushir virus (PARV), Zaliv Terpeniya virus (ZTV), Komandory virus (KOMV), Rukutama virus (RUKV), Okhotskiy virus (OKHV) and Aniva virus (ANIV).

== Place names ==
Tyuleny was known to the Ainu, indigenous people native to Sakhalin, Hokkaido and the Kuril Islands. Japanese maps from the late 19th century contain the Ainu place name: アトヤモシリ (Atoyamoshiri — ‘the island of net fishing’). There are several other Ainu names for this place mentioned in various sources, having other meanings and spelled differently, such as ‘the island of adult fur seals’.

The island first appeared on European maps after the expedition of the Dutch explorer Maarten Gerritszoon Vries in 1643. He named the place “Robben Island” for the place, literally meaning ‘the seal island’. Notably, Vries’ crew also mentioned two huts with hearths on the island, which probably belonged to the Ainu people.

The Russian name ‘Tyuleniy Island’ also means ‘the seal island’ and has been on Russian maps since Adam Johann von Krusenstern’s circumnavigation, including a visit to Tyuleny in 1805.

In 1905, as part of the Treaty of Portsmouth, the Russian Empire ceded both the southern Sakhalin Island and Tyuleny Island to the Empire of Japan. From 1905 to 1945, Tyuleny was part of Imperial Japan and was administered by Karafuto Prefecture. During this time the island acquired its Japanese name 海豹島 (Kaihyo-tou — ‘the seal island’).

The Dutch, Russian and Japanese names for the island are a bit misleading in a biological sense because all three of them refer to the earless seals while the majority of inhabitants (fur seals and sea lions) belong to the eared seals.

== Fur seal commercial hunting ==
The fur seal rookery on Tyuleny Island gained widespread recognition among hunters in 1852. Since then, Russian, Japanese, British and American seal hunters have pursued fur seals of Tyuleny. In the first two years of commercial hunting only (1852–1853), approximately 50,000–60,000 fur seals were slaughtered. Although later commercial harvest was officially limited by quotas, pelts were still taken illegally, pushing the fur seal population to the brink of extinction.

Fur seals were gathered by driving them from their haul-out area to a killing spot (fenced yard-field) where they were held in a large pod. Several seals were then cut from this large pod and driven to a group of several men who stun the animals by hitting them on the skull or upper neck with a solid wooden club.

Various attempts were made for fur seal conservation, involving local initiatives and international cooperation. To counteract poaching and illegal fur trade, the Russian Empire established a garrison on the island from 1884 until the Russo-Japanese War in 1904. This led to the seizure of several schooners by Russian men-of-war in 1884 and 1891, including the arrest of a party of seventeen men left by a British vessel in 1895. By 1919, a Japanese representative was stationed on the island to prevent exploitation of the island's seals.

International measures contributing towards enforcement included North Pacific Fur Seal Convention of 1911 and Interim Convention on the Conservation of North Pacific Fur Seal of 1957. The profitability of seal hunting gradually faded, and the last official commercial hunting on the island occurred in 2008.

== Anthropogenic impact ==
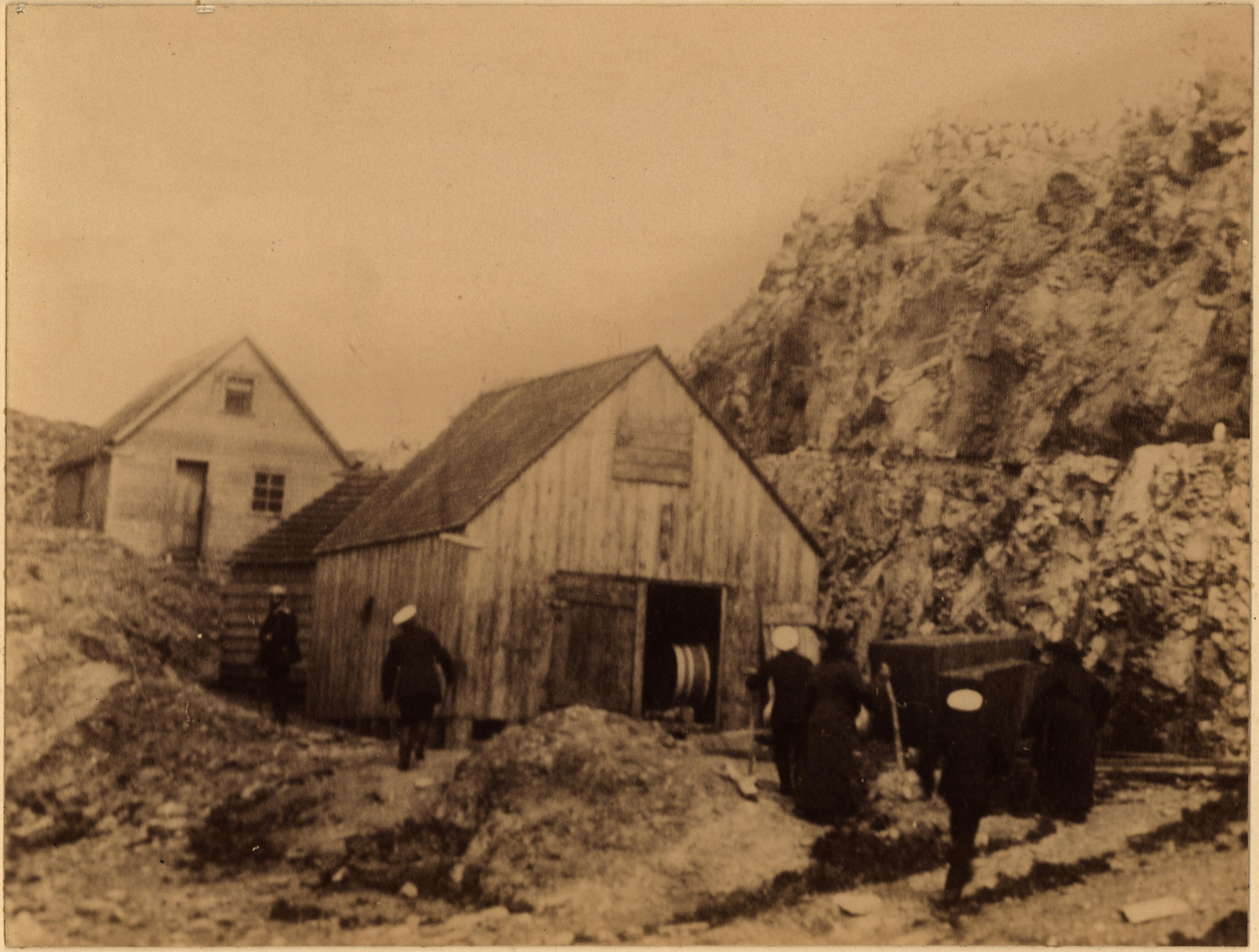
Summer quarters for the Russian naval detachment on the island in the late 1800s

Despite being an uninhabited small island, Tyuleny historically faced significant anthropogenic pressure.

The island hosted a Russian military garrison from 1884 to 1904 and a Japanese garrison until 1945. Vestiges of Japanese military pillboxes and breastworks for gun carriage can still be found on the island. On July 2, 1945, the US submarine ‘Barb’ bombarded the island. As a result, several buildings were destroyed, a fuel warehouse burned, and six people died.

Since the late 19th century, various structures were established on the island, including houses for hunters and military personnel, small factories for fur seal skinning and salting pelts, as well as a fenced yard-field for killing. In 1965, Soviet hunters artificially expanded the fur seal rookery by flattening the least steep slope of the rock, creating a pathway for fur seals to ascend from the beach to the plateau. Additionally, a wooden construction on piles was established on the beach (however, it was shortly deconstructed due to low efficiency).

Currently there are fences separating the guillemots’ and fur seals’ breeding plots as well as territory for scientists, including wildlife observation towers and old Soviet buildings.

== Ecological problems ==
In 2014, poachers attacked the island once again. They demolished the fences separating the territories of birds and pinnipeds, leading to fur seals trampling thousands of guillemot eggs. The house designated for visiting scientists was plundered, with doors and windows left open. Numerous birds died in the house as they flew in but were unable to fly off. On the beach, many fur seals were found slaughtered, their corpses left unsuccessfully skinned.

Another significant problem affecting local pinnipeds is marine plastic pollution. Young fur seals and sea lions play with scraps of fishing nets, plastic straps, and other gear that entangles around their necks and cannot be removed. As the neck continues to grow, especially in males, the collar becomes critically tight, causing deep, unhealing wounds, often resulting in death. The animal could be caught while being on a terrestrial breeding spot, and the collar might be removed if the wound is not too deep. Many of Tyuleny’s pinnipeds have such collars, and there are a couple of local volunteer groups that visit the island to remove the collars, working together with scientists. At least 350 animals were saved over four years.

Abandoned factories and dilapidated constructions remain on the island, contributing to a significant amount of anthropogenic rubbish, especially as these constructions gradually deteriorate.
