= List of traffic separation schemes =

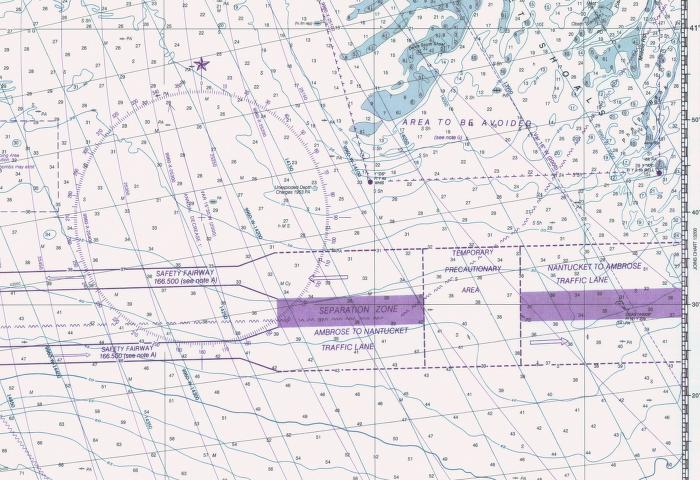
Example of a TSS on a chart

A traffic separation scheme (or 'TSS') is an area in the sea where navigation of ships is highly regulated. Each TSS is designed to create lanes in the water with ships in a specific lane all travelling in (roughly) the same direction.

A TSS is typically created in locations with large numbers of ship movements and vessels travelling in different directions and where there might otherwise be a high risk of collisions. Details of traffic separation schemes and similar routing-systems can be found on Admiralty charts.

In the list below, where a TSS or routing scheme is not governed by the IMO (IMO), then the governing body is mentioned in brackets.

== History ==
Internationally agreed traffic separation schemes were first adopted by the IMCO (precursor to the IMO) in November 1973.

== Atlantic Ocean: East ==
=== Europe ===
- Approaches to Vigo (Spain)
- Cape Roca or Cabo da Roca
- Cape St. Vincent or Cabo de São Vicente
- Banco del Hoyo
- Canary Islands
- off Finisterre
- before the coast of Ouessant (in English: Ushant).
- around the Isles of Scilly, off the coast at Lands End
- Fastnet Rock, south of Ireland

=== Irish Sea ===
- Off Tuskar Rock, named after the lighthouse on one of the islands forming Tuskar rock
- Off Smalls
- Holyhead Harbour, governed by Stena Line Ferries/
- Off Skerries at the northern coast of Northern Ireland
- Liverpool Bay
- Approaches to Dublin, governed by the Government of Ireland
- In the North Channel
- Off Neist Point

=== English Channel ===
The English Channel connects the Atlantic Ocean with the Southern part of the North Sea and is one of the busiest shipping areas in the world with ships going in numerous direction: some are passing through in transit from the Southwest to Northeast (or vice versa) and others serving the many ports around the English Channel, including ferries crossing the Channel. In the English Channel several TSS schemes are in operation:

- Dover Straits TSS
- Casquets TSS near Alderney
- West Hinder TSS off the Belgium coast.

=== Southern North-Sea ===
The Southern North Sea overlaps the TSS mentioned in the English Channel above

- Approaches to the River Humber
- Sunk and Northern approaches to the Thames Estuary
- North Hinder TSS
- Approaches to Hook of Holland

=== Russia and Norway ===
Some TSSs in these areas are not governed by the IMO but by either the government of Russia or the government of Norway.

Russia

- off Mys Zimnegorskiy
- off Ostrov Sosnovets
- off Ostrova Ponoyskiye Ludki
- off Tersko-Orlovskiy
- off Svyatonosskiy Poluostrov
- Entrance to Kol'skiy Zaliv
- Proliv Karskiye Vorota

Norway

- off Makkaur
- off Cape Nordkinn
- off North Cape
- 4 different TSSs around Oslo Fjord

IMO

- Coast of Western Norway
- Coast of Southern Norway
- Vardø to Røst
- off the southwest coast of Iceland

=== Baltic Sea ===
Most TSSs in the Baltic Sea are governed by the IMO, but some are the responsibility of the local country.

- Sea of Åland
- Seskar Island (R)
- Sommers Island
- Gogland or Hogland Island
- Rodsher Island
- Kalbådagrund Lighthouse
- Porkkala Lighthouse
- Hanko Peninsula
- Hiiumaa Peninsula
- Approaches to Stockholm, Sandhamn entrance (Sweden)
- Hoburgs Bank, North and South
- West Klintehamn
- South Midsjöbankarna
- Adlergrund
- Slupska Bank
- Öland Island
- Bornholmsgat
- North of Rügen
- South of Gedser
- Between Korsør and Sprogø
- Hatter Barn
- Skagen West
- Skagen East
- Fladen
- Lilla Middelgrund
- Entrance to the Sound
- In The Sound
- Falsterbo
- Kiel Lighthouse
- Zatoka Gdanska or Gdańsk Bay (Poland)

=== North Sea: Denmark, Germany, The Netherlands ===
In the North Sea, there are several TSSs to manage the traffic to and from some of the busiest ports in the world, such as Rotterdam, Bremerhaven, Amsterdam, and Antwerp. All of these TSSs and routing schemes are governed by the IMO.

- German Bight, Western approach
- Approaches to the River Elbe
- Jade approach
- Terschelling - German Bight
- Vlieland North
- Vlieland
- Texel
- Brown Ridge
- West Friesland
- East Friesland
- Botney Ground

=== Mediterranean Sea and Black Sea ===
Numerous TSS's and similar routing-schemes are active in the Mediterranean Sea, the Black Sea and the waters within this area such as the Adriatic Sea. On the charts of the United Kingdom Hydrographic Office some 56 schemes can be found. Many of these schemes are governed by the local state, such as Italy, Spain, Croatia etc.)

Some of the most important TSS's are mentioned below. A complete list can be retrieved from the Notice 17: TRAFFIC SEPARATION SCHEMES AND INFORMATION CONCERNING ROUTEING SYSTEMS SHOWN ON ADMIRALTY CHARTS

- Strait of Gibraltar
- Approaches to Skikda, Algeria (Algeria)
- Approaches to Barcelona (Spain)
- Approaches to Genoa (Italy)
- Approaches to Naples (Italy)
- TSS in the North Adriatic Sea
- TSS in the Strait of Messina (Italy)
- Approach to the Port of Piraeus (Athens, Greece)
- Between the Dardanelles and Istanbul including the Bosphorus
- Approaches to the Port of Odesa
- Sevastopol Harbour approaches
- Western and Eastern approaches to Bur Sa'id (Port Said)

== Atlantic Ocean: West ==
On the Western shores of the Atlantic Ocean are the eastern coasts of North America with the United States of America and Canada. Then there is the Caribbean Sea, the Gulf of Mexico and South America's east coast.

=== Caribbean Sea and Gulf of Mexico ===
- Canal de Maracaibo, (Venezuela)
- Golfo de Venezuela or Gulf of Venezuela, (Venezuela)
- off Cabo San Antonio
- off La Tabla
- off Costa de Matanzas, Cuba
- in the Old Bahama Channel
- off Punta Maternillos, Cuba
- off Punta Lucretia, Cuba
- off Cape Maisí, Cuba
- in the approaches of the Port of Veracruz
- in the approaches to Galveston Bay, (IMO with parts by the US Government)

=== East Coast of North America ===
- the approaches of Cape Fear River
- the approaches of Chesapeake Bay
- Chesapeake Bay, off Smith Point, (US government)
- off Delaware Bay
- off New York
- the approaches to Narragansett Bay, Rhode Island and Buzzards Bay
- the approaches to Boston, Massachusetts
- the approaches to Portland, Maine
- approaches to Bay of Fundy
- approaches to Halifax Harbor
- approaches to Chedabucto Bay
- Saint Lawrence River and Gulf of Saint Lawrence, (Canada)
- St. George's Bay, (Canada)
- Placentia Bay, (Canada)

== Indian Ocean ==
=== Indian Ocean: Africa ===
Apart from the TSS schemes in the Mediterranean to the north, the African continent has only a few TSS schemes around the waters of South Africa:

- approaches to Port Elizabeth (South Africa)
- approaches to Saldanha Bay (South Africa)
- approaches to Table Bay (South Africa)
- Alphard Banks, South of Cape Infanta
- FA Platform, South of Cape St. Blaize (Mossel Bay)

=== Arabian Peninsula ===
This covers the Red Sea, Arabian Sea and Persian Gulf. Some 15 TSS schemes can be found in this area: in the Red Sea is traffic using the Suez Channel while in the Persian Gulf much of the traffic comprises the (large) oil and gas tankers to Iran and Iraq. All TSS's here are governed by the IMO, except the Approaches to Yanbu which is the responsibility of the Kingdom of Saudi Arabia.

- Gulf of Suez
- Straits of Tiran
- approaches to Yanbu (The Royal Commission for Jubail and Yanbu’, Kingdom of Saudi Arabia)
- in Bab-el-Mandeb
- West and South of Hanish al Kubra (Hanish Islands)
- East of Zuqar Island (Jabal al-Tair Island)
- off Ra’s al Hadd
- off Ra’s al Kûh (which forms the border of the Persian Gulf)
- Strait of Hormuz
- Tonb-Forur
- off Mînâ’al Ahmadî
- between Zaqqum and Umm Shaif oil-fields
- approaches to Ra’s Tannûrah
- approaches to Ra’s al Ju’aymah (Saudi Arabia)
- between Zuluf and Marian Oilfields

=== Central Indian Ocean ===
The Indian Ocean region links in the West with the (above) area of the Arabian Sea and the African continent and in the East it borders with the Pacific Ocean. Apart from schemes in these border-areas only two TSS's are mentioned around India and Sri Lanka:

- off Mumbai, India, governed by the Director General Shipping, India
- off Dondra Head, Sri Lanka

=== Malacca Strait, Singapore Strait and Sumatra ===
On the Eastern borders of the Indian Ocean are the Malacca Strait, Singapore Strait and the waters around the Indonesian island of Sumatra. This is a very busy shipping area and also very dangerous (see also this section).

- Singapore Harbour area - the waters around Singapore are part of two TSS schemes governed by the Maritime and Port Authority of Singapore
- One Fathom Bank
- Port Klang to Port Dickson
- Port Dickson to Tanjung Kling
- Malacca to Iyu Kecil (Karimun Regency)
- Three TSS in the Singapore Straits: Main Strait, Saint John's Island and off Changi
- Horsburgh Lighthouse at the entrance of the Singapore Strait

== Pacific Ocean ==
=== China Seas ===
Some 25 TSS schemes are in operation in and around the China Seas. Shipping is very busy around Hong Kong, the mainland of South-East China and around Taiwan.

Some of the most important TSS schemes in this area:

- East Lamma Channel off Lamma Island, Hong Kong
- Tathong Channel, Hong Kong
- Cheung Chau North and West (SAR Hong Kong)
- Dangan Shuida and Lan Tau channel (SAR Hong Kong)
- Qingzhou, (China). only applies to high-speed craft
- approaches to Shanghai, (China)
- Chengshan Jiao (IMO)
- approaches to Dalian, (China)
- approaches to Caofeidian, (China)
- Taichung
- Chilung
- Taipei
- approaches to Kaohsiung, (Kaohsiung Harbour Bureau)
- North Eastern approaches to Qiongzhou Haixia, (China)

=== Japan ===
In Japan there are 5 TSS's all governed by the Japanese government. Apart from these mandatory schemes there are also voluntary and recommended schemes. These are not shown on Admiralty Charts and (thus) not shown in this overview

- Kurushima Kaikyo off Ōshima
- North, South and East Bisan Seto; approaches to Mizushima and Uko
- Akashi Kaikyō
- Irago Suido
- Na Ka-no-Se

=== Korea and Russia (Pacific Coast) ===
In (North) Korean and Pacific Russian waters some 35 schemes are in operation with only 5 of them being governed by the IMO. All major ports in this area have a TSS in operation. In North Korea none of the TSS schemes are IMO schemes; only locally governed by the North Korean central government. Below an overview of the IMO schemes and some of the most important locally governed schemes:

- Nampho
- Wonsan
- Hong Do
- Chongjin
- Najin
- approaches to Vladivostok, (Russia)
- approaches to Zaliv Nakhodka (to Kozmino), (IMO)
- off Mys Ostrovnoy, (IMO)
- off Mys Anvina, (IMO)
- Proliv Bussol’, (IMO)
- Chetvertyy Kuril’skiy Proliv, (IMO)
- approaches to Avachinskaya Guba, (Avachinsky, Kamchatka Peninsula)

=== Philippines, Borneo and Indonesia ===
There are six TSS's around the Philippines and one in Malaysia. None of them are governed by the IMO:

- Isla Verde Passage or Verde Island Passage, (Government of Philippines)
- approaches to Manila Bay, (Government of Philippines)
- approaches to Manila Harbour, (Government of Philippines)
- Cebu, Mactan Channel, (Government of Philippines)
- Malapascua Island, (Government of Philippines)
- Batangas, (Government of Philippines)
- approaches to Bintulu Port, (Government of Malaysia)

=== Australia and Papua New Guinea ===
In this area there are four TSS's governed by the IMO:

- In the Bass Strait
- South of Wilsons Promontory in the Bass Strait
- Off Cape Leeuwin
- Off Chatham Island

There are also two leading to Australian ports, governed by Australia:

- Port Darwin
- Botany Bay

There was one other TSS, which has now been revoked:

- Port Jackson, revoked on 25 September 2024

=== Aleutian Islands, Alaska, US West Coast, Canada and Mexico ===
On the East side of the Pacific Ocean the TSS's are divided in two groups. The North side includes the West coast of Mexico and everything to its North. The other group are formed by the West coast of Central and South America.

The TSS's in the far North around the Aleutian Islands and Alaska are not put in place because of the high density of shipping but the nature of the ships and the vulnerability of the area.

The TSS schemes are:

- Prince William Sound and Valdez Arm
- Strait of Juan de Fuca and approaches
- Puget Sound and areas around it
- Vancouver Harbour, (Canada)
- off San Francisco
- San Francisco Harbour and inner approaches, (USA)
- Santa Barbara Channel in the approaches to Long Beach, Los Angeles
- approaches to Manzanillo, (API Manzanillo)
- approaches to Salina Cruz

=== Pacific: Central and South America ===
The IMO governs 16 TSS schemes on the Pacific side of Central and South America:

- landfall and approaches to Talara Bay, Peru
- landfall and approaches to Bahia de Paita, Peru
- landfall of Puerto Salaverry, Peru
- landfall and approaches to Chimbote or Ferrol Bay, Peru
- approaches to Callao, Peru
- landfall and approaches to San Martín
- landfall and approaches to San Nicolas Bay
- landfall and approaches to Puerto Ilo
- landfall and approaches to Arica
- landfall and approaches to Iquique
- landfall and approaches to Antofagasta
- in the approaches to Quintero Bay
- in the approaches to Valparaíso
- in the approaches to Bay of Concepción
- in the approaches to Bahía San Vicente, Chile
- in the approaches to Puntas Arenas
