= List of shipwrecks in May 1855 =

The list of shipwrecks in May 1855 includes ships sunk, wrecked or otherwise lost during May 1855.

== 1 May ==
List of shipwrecks: 1 May 1855
Ship	State	Description
Acton	United States	The steamship was destroyed by fire on the "Yarrow River", Louisiana.
Triton	Belgium	The brig sprang a leak and was abandoned in the Atlantic Ocean. Her crew were rescued by Rover's Bride (United Kingdom). Triton was on a voyage from Cardiff, Glamorgan, United Kingdom to Lisbon, Portugal.
Queen of the Teign	United Kingdom	The ship ran aground on the Goodwin Sands, Kent. Her five crew were rescued by the lifeboat Northumberland (United Kingdom). Queen of the Teign was on a voyage from Antwerp, Belgium to Liverpool, Lancashire. She was refloated with the assistance of Northumberland and the lugger Fame (United Kingdom) and taken in to Ramsgate, Kent in a severely leaky condition.

== 2 May ==
List of shipwrecks: 2 May 1855
Ship	State	Description
Conference	United Kingdom	The ship was attacked by pirates off the Barbary Coast and was abandoned by her crew.
Eclipse	United Kingdom	The brig ran aground at Little Bauline, Nova Scotia, British North America.
Europe	United Kingdom	The brig foundered. Her crew were rescued.
Gem	United Kingdom	The schooner was driven ashore on the Black Law. She was refloated and taken in to Lindisfarne, Northumberland.
Lively	United Kingdom	The ship was abandoned in the Mediterranean Sea off Cape Tres Forcas, Morocco and was subsequently boarded by Moorish pirates. She was on a voyage from Hartlepool, County Durham to Malta. Lively was later boarded by the crew of Conference (United Kingdom) and taken in to Gibraltar, where she had arrived by 19 May.
Lord Nelson	United Kingdom	The brig foundered off the Chilean boast, on a voyage from Chañaral, Chile to Swansea, Wales. Her crew were rescued.

== 3 May ==
List of shipwrecks: 3 May 1855
Ship	State	Description
G. W. Thompson	United States	The ship was destroyed by fire in the Atlantic Ocean. Her crew were rescued by Northern Eagle (United States). G. W. Thompson was on a voyage from New York to San Francisco, California.
Robert	United Kingdom	The ship was driven ashore and wrecked at the entrance to the Dardanelles. She was on a voyage from Liverpool, Lancashire to Constantinople, Ottoman Empire.

== 4 May ==
List of shipwrecks: 4 May 1855
Ship	State	Description
Dover	United Kingdom	The ship was driven ashore and wrecked at Ostend, West Flanders, Belgium.
Hanover	United Kingdom	The ship ran aground at the mouth of the Bassein River. She was on a voyage from Rangoon, Burma to a British port. She was refloated.
John	United Kingdom	The ship struck The Manacles and consequently sank in Godrevy Cove, Cornwall with the loss of 194 lives. Her crew and about 60 passengers were rescued. She was on a voyage from Plymouth, Devon to Quebec City, Province of Canada, British North America.
Minerva	United Kingdom	The ship struck the Willow Shoal and sank. Her crew were rescued She was on a voyage from Plymouth to Newport, Monmouthshire.
Samuel Bakker	Danzig	The ship was in collision with Westmoreland (United Kingdom) and sank in the River Thames. She was refloated and taken in to the West India Docks, London, United Kingdom.
HMS Weser	Royal Navy	The paddle gunboat ran aground in the Dardanelles as she was passing Robert (United Kingdom). She was refloated and taken in to Constantinople, Ottoman Empire for repairs.

== 5 May ==
List of shipwrecks: 5 May 1855
Ship	State	Description
Agnes Blaikie	United Kingdom	Crimean War: The barque collided with the paddle packet boat HMS Medina (Royal Navy) and sank in the Black Sea off Balaklava, Russia. Her crew were rescued.
Caroline	United Kingdom	The barque was driven ashore 2 nautical miles (3.7 km) west of Libava, Courland Governorate. All on board were rescued. She was on a voyage from Blyth, Northumberland to Copenhagen, Denmark.
Ellen	United Kingdom	The ship ran aground off Sunderland, County Durham.
Empress Eugenie	United Kingdom	The ship was abandoned in the Atlantic Ocean. All on board were rescued by Stadacona (United States). Empress Euguenie was on a voyage from Liverpool to Montreal, Province of Canada, British North America.
Woodstock	(United Kingdom of Great Britain and Ireland) British North America	The barque was wrecked on a reef 100 nautical miles (190 km) south of Cape San Antonio, Cuba. Her crew were rescued.

== 6 May ==
List of shipwrecks: 6 May 1855
Ship	State	Description
Cambyses	United Kingdom	The ship foundered in the Atlantic Ocean 100 nautical miles (190 km) west of Cape Clear Island, County Cork with the loss of three of her ten crew. She was on a voyage from Liverpool, Lancashire to Canso, Nova Scotia and Sherbrooke, Province of Canada, British North America.
George	Kingdom of Hanover	The ship struck the Shark's Fin Rock, off the coast of Cornwall, United Kingdom and foundered. Her crew were rescued. She was on a voyage from Hamburg to Neath, Glamorgan, United Kingdom.

== 7 May ==
List of shipwrecks: 7 May 1855
Ship	State	Description
Adeline	France	The ship was driven ashore and wrecked at Land's End, Cornwall, United Kingdom. Her crew survived. She was on a voyage from Cette, Hérault to Dunkirk, Nord.
Empire	United Kingdom	The ship ran aground on the Bridge Rocks. She was on a voyage form Limerick to Glasgow, Renfrewshire. She was refloated and put back to Limerick.
Gram Para	Portugal	The brig was driven ashore and wrecked in Freshwater Bay, Pembrokeshire, United Kingdom. She was on a voyage from Pará, Brazil to Liverpool, Lancashire, United Kingdom.
Pelham	United Kingdom	The ship departed from Tralee, County Kerry for Liverpool. No further trace, presumed foundered with the loss of all hands.

== 8 May ==
List of shipwrecks: 8 May 1855
Ship	State	Description
Augusta	Duchy of Holstein	The ship was driven ashore and wrecked near Rottingdean, Sussex, United Kingdom. Her crew were rescued. She was on a voyage from Lisbon, Portugal to Flensburg.

== 9 May ==
List of shipwrecks: 9 May 1855
Ship	State	Description
Anna Elizabeth	United Kingdom	The ship was wrecked on a reef off the coast of the Courland Governorate.
Egham	United Kingdom	The ship ran aground on the Cardiff Flats, in the Bristol Channel. She was refloated and beached at Penarth, Glamorgan, where she was severely damaged.
Jemima	United Kingdom	The ship was driven ashore and severely damaged at "Wornpoer", Denmark. Her crew were rescued. She was on a voyage from Hull, Yorkshire to Helsingør, Denmark.
Jessie Mitchell	United Kingdom	The brig was driven ashore and wrecked at Bonchurch, Isle of Wight. Her crew were rescued. She was on a voyage from Hartlepool, County Durham to Alexandria, Egypt.
Leon Victoire	France	The sloop ran aground on the Steel Sand, in the North Sea. She was on a voyage from London, United Kingdom to Hamburg.
Spark	United Kingdom	The ship ran aground at Waterford. She was on a voyage from Waterford to Swansea, Glamorgan. She was refloated the next day and resumed her voyage.
Thetis	United Kingdom	The ship ran aground on the Hinder Bank, in the North Sea. She was refloated and taken in to Hellevoetsluis, Zeeland, Netherlands.

== 10 May ==
List of shipwrecks: 10 May 1855
Ship	State	Description
British Queen	United Kingdom	The ship was lost near "Fealtung", Norway. Her crew were rescued.
James McQueen	United Kingdom	The brig was wrecked on the Gunfleet Sand, in the North Sea off the coast of Essex. She was on a voyage from Leith, Lothian to Matanzas, Cuba. She was refloated with the assistance of the tug Commodore and the lugger Secret (both United Kingdom) and taken in to Harwich, Essex.
Vorwaerts	Danzig	The full-rigged ship sank in the North Sea. Her crew were rescued. She was on a voyage from Liverpool, Lancashire, United Kingdom to Danzig.

== 11 May ==
List of shipwrecks: 11 May 1855
Ship	State	Description
Eliasaph	United Kingdom	The ship was holed by her anchor and sank at Wells-next-the-Sea, Norfolk. She was on a voyage from Goole, Yorkshire to Wells-next-the-Sea.
Highland Lassie	United Kingdom	The brig ran aground at Adelaide, South Australia. She was on a voyage from Melbourne, Victoria to Adelaide.

== 12 May ==
List of shipwrecks: 12 May 1855
Ship	State	Description
Ophelia and Mary	United Kingdom	The ship was lost at "Toreko". Her crew were rescued.

== 13 May ==
List of shipwrecks: 13 May 1855
Ship	State	Description
Nashwauk	United Kingdom	The ship was driven ashore near Adelaide, South Australia. All on board were rescued.
Timandra	France	The ship was wrecked near Molène, Finistère. She was on a voyage from Trinidad to London, United Kingdom.

== 14 May ==
List of shipwrecks: 14 May 1855
Ship	State	Description
Anna Elizabeth	Netherlands	The koff was driven ashore by ice in Karso Sound. Her crew were rescued.
Enterprise	United States	The ship wrecked on a reef on the northeast end of Urup in the Kuril Islands while attempting to enter the Sea of Okhotsk via Bussol Strait. All hands were saved.
Huntress	United States	The full-rigged ship ran aground and was damaged at Akyab, Burma. She was on a voyage from Akyab to Falmouth. She was refloated and resumed her voyage.
King Fisher	United States	The ship wrecked on a reef on the northeast end of Urup in the Kuril Islands while attempting to enter the Sea of Okhotsk via Bussol Strait. They remained on Urup for three days before being saved by the ships Joseph Hayden, of Bremen, and Montezuma (United States). All hands were saved.

== 15 May ==
List of shipwrecks: 15 May 1855
Ship	State	Description
Inglewood	United Kingdom	The ship departed from Amoy, Burma for Singapore, Straits Settlements. No further trace, presumed foundered with the loss of all hands.
William Ward	United Kingdom	The full-rigged ship sank off Cape Clear Island, County Cork. Her 34 crew were rescued. She was on a voyage from Liverpool, Lancashire to Halifax, Nova Scotia, British North America. She subsequently refloated when her cargo of salt dissolved.
Volga (Волга)	Imperial Russian Navy	Crimean War: The transport ship ran aground between fi:Kuorsalo and fi:Tammio in the Gulf of Finland. She was abandoned and set afire on 18 May to prevent her being captured. Her crew were rescued by the steamship Nadyozhny (Надёжный, Imperial Russian Navy). The area became known as Volganmatala ('Volga Shallows').

== 16 May ==
List of shipwrecks: 16 May 1855
Ship	State	Description
Commodore	United Kingdom	The ship sank at Fredrikshavn, Denmark. She was on a voyage from Memek, Prussia to Montrose, Forfarshire.
Daniel Grant	United Kingdom	The ship was wrecked on Helen's Reef, in the China Sea. Her crew were rescued. She was on a voyage from Shanghai, China to Liverpool, Lancashire.
Ellen Hood	United States	The ship was driven ashore near Cape Florida. She was on a voyage from Apalachicola, Florida to Liverpool. She was refloated and put in to Key West, Florida.
New Jane	United Kingdom	The ship was driven ashore and wrecked at Newquay, Cornwall.

== 17 May ==
List of shipwrecks: 17 May 1855
Ship	State	Description
Harrington	(United Kingdom of Great Britain and Ireland) British North America	The brig was wrecked on Langlade Island. Her crew were rescued. She was on a voyage from Sydney, Nova Scotia to Saint John's, Newfoundland.
Josephine	(United Kingdom of Great Britain and Ireland) British North America	The schooner was driven ashore and wrecked 10 nautical miles (19 km) west of Cape Receif, Cape Colony. Her crew were rescued. She was on a voyage from Table Bay to Mossel Bay and the Kynsna River.

== 18 May ==
List of shipwrecks: 18 May 1855
Ship	State	Description
Ceylon	United Kingdom	The barque foundered in the Straits of Mindora with the loss of all but three of her crew. She was on a voyage from Manila, Spanish East Indies to Sydney, New South Wales.
Fortune	United Kingdom	The ship ran aground near Dundrum, County Down with the loss of one life. She was on a voyage from Liverpool, Lancashire to Hobart, Van Diemen's Land. Fortune was refloated on 31 May and taken in to Dundrum.
London	United Kingdom	The brig ran aground on a reef off Montego Bay, Jamaica. She was refloated on 20 May and taken in to Montego Bay for repairs.

== 19 May ==
List of shipwrecks: 19 May 1855
Ship	State	Description
Whistley	United States	The clipper was wrecked on King Island, Tasmania with the loss of two of her crew. She was on a voyage from Port Phillip, Victoria to Singapore.

== 20 May ==
List of shipwrecks: 20 May 1855
Ship	State	Description
Abberton	United Kingdom	The barque foundered in the South Atlantic 1,000 nautical miles (1,900 km) off the mouth of the River Plate. Her crew were rescued by the barque Cypress (United Kingdom). Abberton was on a voyage from Callao, Peru to a British port
Brothers	United Kingdom	The schooner was driven ashore at Höganäs, Sweden. She was on a voyage from Liverpool, Lancashire to Pillau, Prussia.
Kitty and Lucy	United Kingdom	The sloop was wrecked at the Mull of Kintyre, Argyllshire. Her crew were rescued. She was on a voyage from Sligo to Liverpool, Lancashire.
Lily	(United Kingdom of Great Britain and Ireland) British North America	The schooner was wrecked on Entry Island, Nova Scotia with the loss of all six crew.
Morrison	United Kingdom	The brig ran aground on the Longsand, in the North Sea off the coast of Essex and was abandoned by her crew, who were rescued by the schooner Hero (United Kingdom). Morrison was on a voyage from South Shields, County Durham to Constantinople, Ottoman Empire.

== 21 May ==
List of shipwrecks: 21 May 1855
Ship	State	Description
Bartley	United Kingdom	The brig was driven ashore and wrecked at Richibucto, New Brunswick, British North America.
Lady Franklin	United Kingdom	The barque was driven ashore at Buctouche, New Brunswick. She was on a voyage from Liverpool, Lancashire to Richibucto. She was refloated on 4 June.

== 22 May ==
List of shipwrecks: 22 May 1855
Ship	State	Description
Feliciana	Brazil	The ship was beached at Pernambuco, where she was wrecked. She was on a voyage from Bahia to Marseille, Bouches-du-Rhône, France.
Jason	United Kingdom	The ship ran aground in the Baie de Somme. She was on a voyage from North Shields, County Durham to Abbeville, Somme, France.

== 24 May ==
List of shipwrecks: 24 May 1855
Ship	State	Description
Blanche	United Kingdom	The ship foundered in the Atlantic Ocean. Her crew survived. She was on a voyage from Liverpool, Lancashire to New Orleans, Louisiana, United States.
Pioneer	United Kingdom	The ship ran aground on the North Bull, in the Irish Sea and was damaged.

== 25 May ==
List of shipwrecks: 25 May 1855
Ship	State	Description
Triflen	United Kingdom	The schooner ran aground on the Doom Bar, off Padstow, Cornwall.

== 26 May ==
List of shipwrecks: 26 May 1855
Ship	State	Description
Dorothea and Ernestine	Hamburg	The ship ran aground on the Bard Island Reef. She was on a voyage from Hamburg to Saint Thomas, Virgin Islands. She was refloated the next day and taken in to Saint John's, Antigua for repairs.
Eerstelling	Netherlands	The full-rigged ship was driven ashore between the Charooghlea Creek and the Jullea Khally Creek, Burma. She was later refloated.
Fortune	United Kingdom	The ship sprang a leak and foundered off the Noss Head Lighthouse, Caithness. Her two crew were rescued by Spartan (United Kingdom).
Mary Stenhouse	United Kingdom	The full-rigged ship was driven ashore between the Charoogha Creek and the Jullia Creek, Burma. She was later refloated.
Voorstelling	Netherlands	The barque was driven ashore between the Charoogha Creek and Jullia Creek. she was later refloated.

== 28 May ==
List of shipwrecks: 28 May 1855
Ship	State	Description
Maypo	United Kingdom	The ship was wrecked on King's Island, Van Diemens Land with the loss of four of her crew. She was on a voyage from Melbourne, Victoria to Calcutta, India.

== 29 May ==
List of shipwrecks: 29 May 1855
Ship	State	Description
Christopher and Elizabeth	United Kingdom	The Mersey Flat sank in the River Mersey off Leasowe, Cheshire. Her crew were rescued. She was on a voyage from Mostyn, Flintshire to Liverpool, Lancashire.
James	United Kingdom	The sloop sank on the Sheringham Flats, in the North Sea off Cromer, Norfolk with the loss of all hands.
HMS Wizard	Royal Navy	The Cherokee-class brig-sloop ran aground at Cork. She was refloated the next day.

== 30 May ==
List of shipwrecks: 30 May 1855
Ship	State	Description
Faithful	United Kingdom	The ship was driven ashore at Weybourne, Norfolk. Her crew were rescued.
Lucy Sharp	United Kingdom	The full-rigged ship sprang a leak and foundered 35 nautical miles (65 km) south south west of the Rangoon Lighthouse, Burma. She was on a voyage from Akyab to Moulmein.
Mary Ann	United Kingdom	The brig was driven ashore at Donna Nook, Lincolnshire. She was refloated on 14 June with assistance from the tug Endeavour (United Kingdom) and taken in to Grimsby, Lincolnshire.
Reformation	United Kingdom	The sloop was driven ashore at Sheringham, Norfolk. Her crew were rescued by the Sheringham Lifeboat.
Ruby	United Kingdom	The fishing lugger foundered in the North Sea off the coast of Norfolk with the loss of all ten crew.
Swift	(United Kingdom of Great Britain and Ireland) Jersey	The ship struck a sunken rock and foundered off Jersey. Her crew were rescued. She was on a voyage from Jersey to Sunderland, County Durham.
Whistler	United States	The ship was wrecked on King's Island, Van Diemen's Land with the loss of two lives. She was on a voyage from Hobson's Bay, Victoria to Singapore, Straits Settlements.

== 31 May ==
List of shipwrecks: 31 May 1855
Ship	State	Description
Harmonie	United Kingdom	The ship was driven ashore at Seacombe, Cheshire. She was on a voyage from Liverpool, Lancashire to Galaţi, Ottoman Empire.
Neil Dow	United Kingdom	The ship was driven ashore and wrecked at Stanley, Falkland Islands. She was on a voyage from Callao, Peru to Queenstown, County Cork.
Shepherdess	United Kingdom	The brig was driven ashore and wrecked in Filey Bay. Her crew were rescued.
St. Lawrence	United Kingdom	The smack was driven ashore and sank at Ramsey, Isle of Man. Her crew were rescued. She was on a voyage from Ardrossan, Ayrshire to Runcorn, Cheshire.

== Unknown date ==
List of shipwrecks: Unknown date in May 1855
Ship	State	Description
Charles Horsfall	United Kingdom	The ship foundered in the Irish Sea between 12 and 23 May. She was on a voyage from Liverpool, Lancashire to Africa.
Comer	United States	The barque was severely damaged by fire and abandoned in the Atlantic Ocean before 31 May.
Cortes	United States	The ship ran aground on the Florida Reef. She was on a voyage from Havana, Cuba to Trieste. She was refloated and put in to Charleston, South Carolina in a leaky condition, arriving on 26 May.
HMS Dapper	Royal Navy	The Dapper-class gunboat ran aground on the Gunfleet Sand, in the North Sea off the coast of Essex. She was refloated and towed in to Sheerness, Kent in a severely leaky condition.
Earl of Derby	United Kingdom	The ship ran aground in the Hooghly River downstream of Fultah Point. She was on a voyage from Bristol, Gloucestershire to Calcutta, India. She was refloated and taken in to Calcutta, where she arrived on 22 May.
Eliptic	United Kingdom	The ship was wrecked at Cape San Antonio, Cuba. She was on a voyage from Jamaica to New York, United States.
Gustave	France	The barque was wrecked at "Millacoree", Africa.
Happy Return	United Kingdom	The schooner was driven ashore at Sunderland, County Durham in late May. She was refloated by was condemned.
Immanuel	Hamburg	The ship was abandoned in the North Sea before 6 May. She was on a voyage from Altona to Guernsey, Channel Islands. She was taken in to Portsmouth Hampshire by Elidee (United Kingdom).
Maria Catharina	Lübeck	The ship was wrecked on the Kunkel, in the Baltic Sea before 31 May. She was on a voyage from Newcastle upon Tyne, Northumberland, United Kingdom to Lübeck.
Martin	United Kingdom	The sloop foundered in Loch Indaal with the loss of all five people on board. She was on a voyage from Glasgow, Renfrewshire to Islay, Inner Hebrides.
Musquash	(United Kingdom of Great Britain and Ireland) Cape Colony	The ketch was wrecked in the Knysna River before 19 May.
Orbit	United Kingdom	The ship was lost off Scatarie Island, Nova Scotia, British North America before 18 May. Her crew were rescued. She was on a voyage from Liverpool to Quebec City, Province of Canada.
HMS Princess Alice	Royal Navy	The paddle steamer ran aground off Fårö, Sweden before 20 May and was damaged. She was refloated.
Rubens	United Kingdom	The ship was driven ashore at Kessingland, Suffolk. She was refloated on 16 May and taken in to Lowestoft, Suffolk in a leaky condition.
Senator	United Kingdom	The barque ran aground at South Shields. She was on a voyage from "Pallas" to South Shields. She was refloated on 30 May.
Wolga	Russia	Crimean War: The transport ship ran aground between "Kuorsalo Island" and "Hamo Island", in the Baltic Sea in late May. Attempts to refloat her with the assistance of the steamship Nadjoschnij (Russia) were unsuccessful and she was burnt to prevent capture by the Royal Navy.
