= Tymovsky =

Tymovsky (masculine), Tymovskaya (feminine), or Tymovskoye (neuter) may refer to:

- Tymovsky District, a district of Sakhalin Oblast, Russia
  - Tymovsky Urban Okrug, the municipal formation which it is incorporated as
- Tymovskoye, an urban locality (an urban-type settlement) in Sakhalin Oblast, Russia
