= Buccinum fukureum =

Scientific classification
- Kingdom: Animalia
- Phylum: Mollusca
- Class: Gastropoda
- Subclass: Caenogastropoda
- Order: Neogastropoda
- Family: Buccinidae
- Genus: Buccinum
- Species: B. fukureum

Binomial name
- Buccinum fukureum Habe & Ito, 1976

Species of gastropod

Buccininum fukureum is a species of Buccinidae. The species is distributed in the southern Sea of Okhotsk, off the Gulf of Patience. Specimens have generally measured 90-92 millimeters. The species is generally found at depths of about 250–300 meters. The species was first described in 1976.
