= IVAO =

IVAO may refer to:

- Ivao Group
- International Virtual Aviation Organisation, an online flight-simulation network
