= Rudakov (volcano) =

Volcano in Urup Island, Kuril Islands, Russia

- Location within Far Eastern Federal District

Highest point
- Elevation: 532 m (1,745 ft)
- Coordinates: 45.88°N 149.83°E

Geography
- Location: Urup, Kuril Islands, Russia

Geology
- Mountain type: Stratovolcano
- Last eruption: Unknown

Rudakov (Russian: Рудаков) is a stratovolcano located in the central part of Urup Island, Kuril Islands, Russia. The volcano has a 700 metres (2,300 ft) wide crater which contains a 300 m (1,000 ft) wide crater lake.

== See also ==
- List of volcanoes in Russia
