= Tym (Sakhalin) =

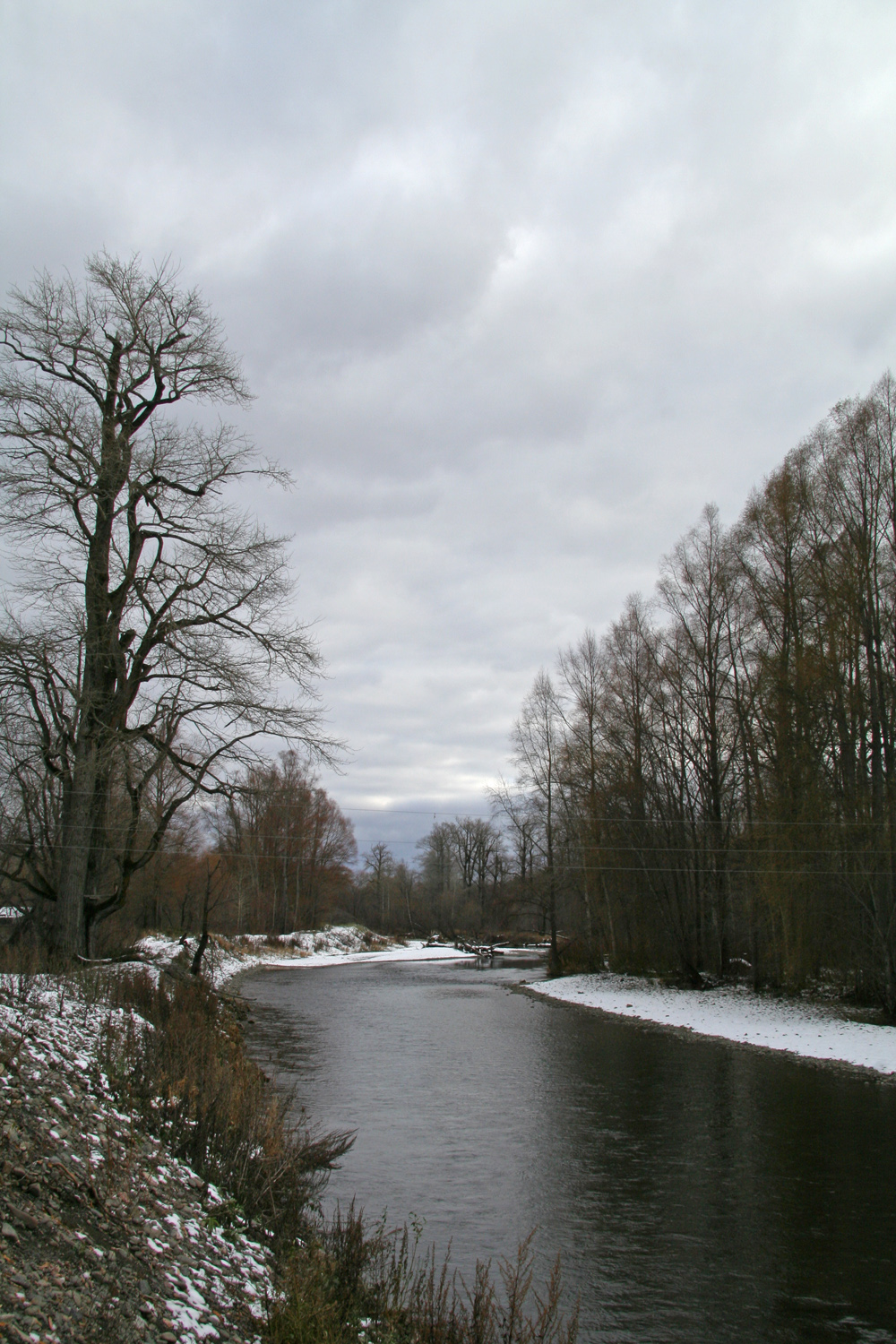

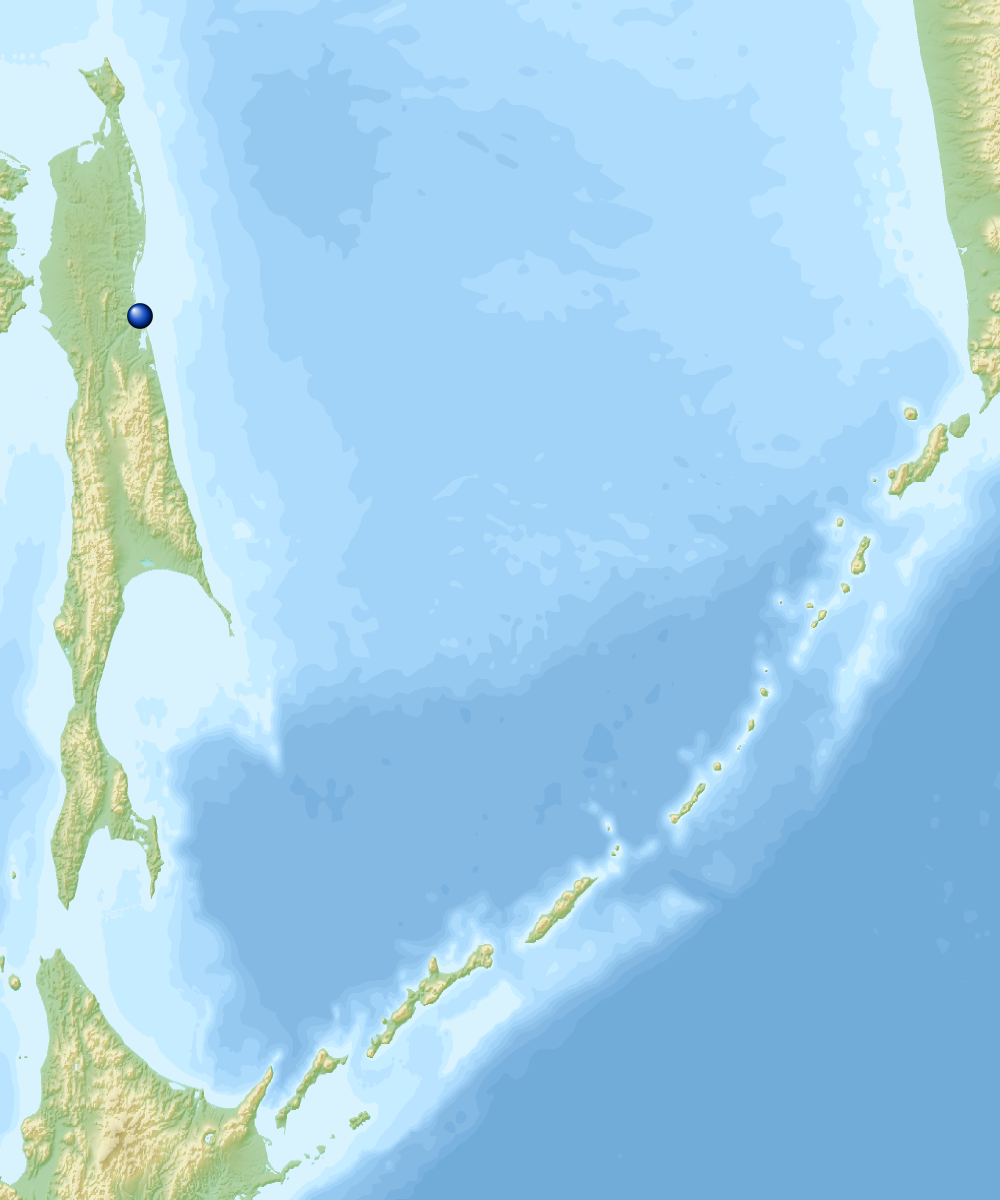
- Location of the mouth of the Tym in Sakhalin Oblast
- Etymology: Nivkh for "spawning river"
- Native name: Тымь (Russian)

Location
- Country: Russia
- State: Sakhalin Oblast

Physical characteristics
- Source: Mount Lopatin, East Sakhalin Mountains
- Mouth: Nyysky Bay, Sea of Okhotsk
  - coordinates: 51°52′07.62″N 143°10′57.45″E
- Length: 330 km (210 mi)
- Basin size: 7,850 km^{2} (3,030 sq mi)
- Discharge
  - average: 89 m^{3}/s (3,100 cu ft/s)

The Tym (Russian: Тымь) is a river on the island of Sakhalin, Russia, and the second longest river on the island after the Poronay. It is 330 kilometres (210 mi) long, and has a drainage basin of 7,850 square kilometres (3,030 sq mi). The name of the river is translated from Nivkh as "spawning river." The river flows through Tymovsky and Nogliki Districts of Sakhalin Oblast. It begins on the southern slopes of Mount Lopatin in the East Sakhalin Mountains, flows through swampy lowlands in the Tym-Poronaiskaya Valley, and finally flows into Nyisky Bay in the Sea of Okhotsk. The villages of Tymovskoye and Nogliki are located beside the river.

The river is mostly fed by snowmelt. The Tym freezes between November and early December, and the spring break occurs between the end of April and May. The highest level of flow has been observed in the second week of May, and the lowest has been observed in the third week of August. There are about 400 lakes in the river's basin, with a combined area of about 9.5 km^{2}.

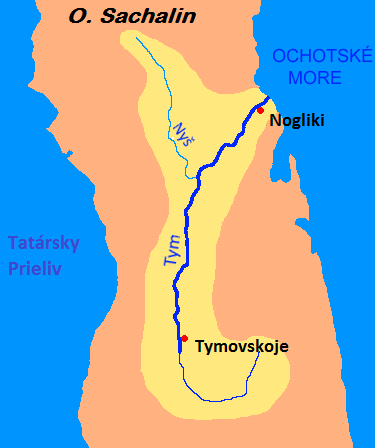
Map of the Tym watershed.

The largest tributaries of the Tym are listed below, with their length in kilometers given in parentheses:

Right tributaries

- Pilenga (63)
  - Parkata (60)
- Imchin (59)
- Uskov (39)

Left tributaries

- Nysh (116)
- Chachma (93)
- Little Tym (66)
- Aleksandrovka (48)
- Red (46)

The river is navigable by rafts and light boats up to 80 km (50 mi) from its mouth. The passage of typhoons can bring significant flooding. The Tym and its tributaries are rich in spawning salmon.

Some agriculture is carried out in the Tym valley, producing potatoes and vegetables, as well as raising cattle for meat and dairy products. Although the growing season averages less than 100 days, Soviet scientists optimistically called the river valley "the granary of Sakhalin". To this end, a collective farm called "Krasnaya Tym" ("Red Tym"; coordinates 50°47′11″N 142°40′23″E) was established in Soviet times. Timber is also harvested in the valley.

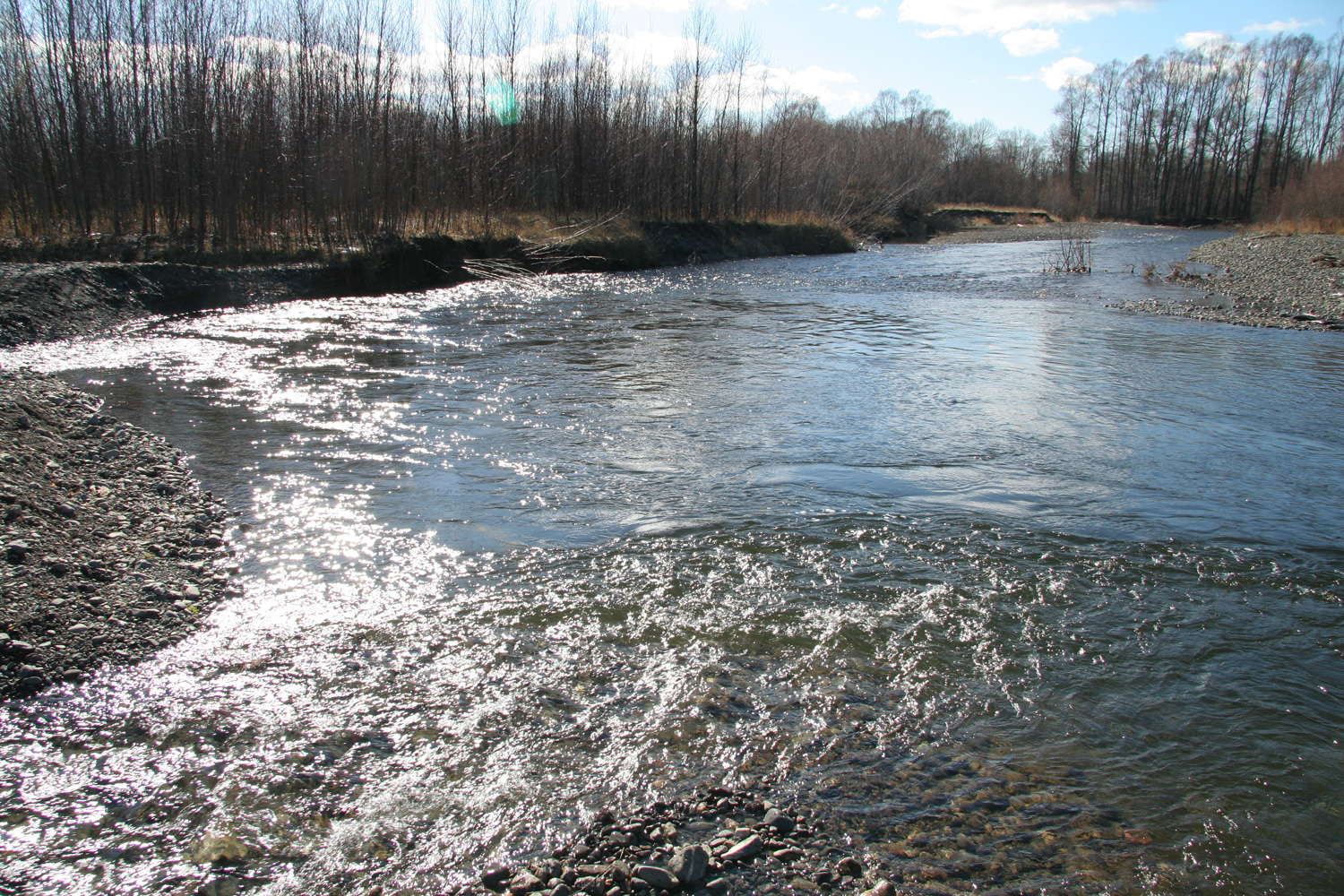
Tym River
