= Maarten Gerritszoon Vries =

Dutch explorer and cartographer (1589–1647)

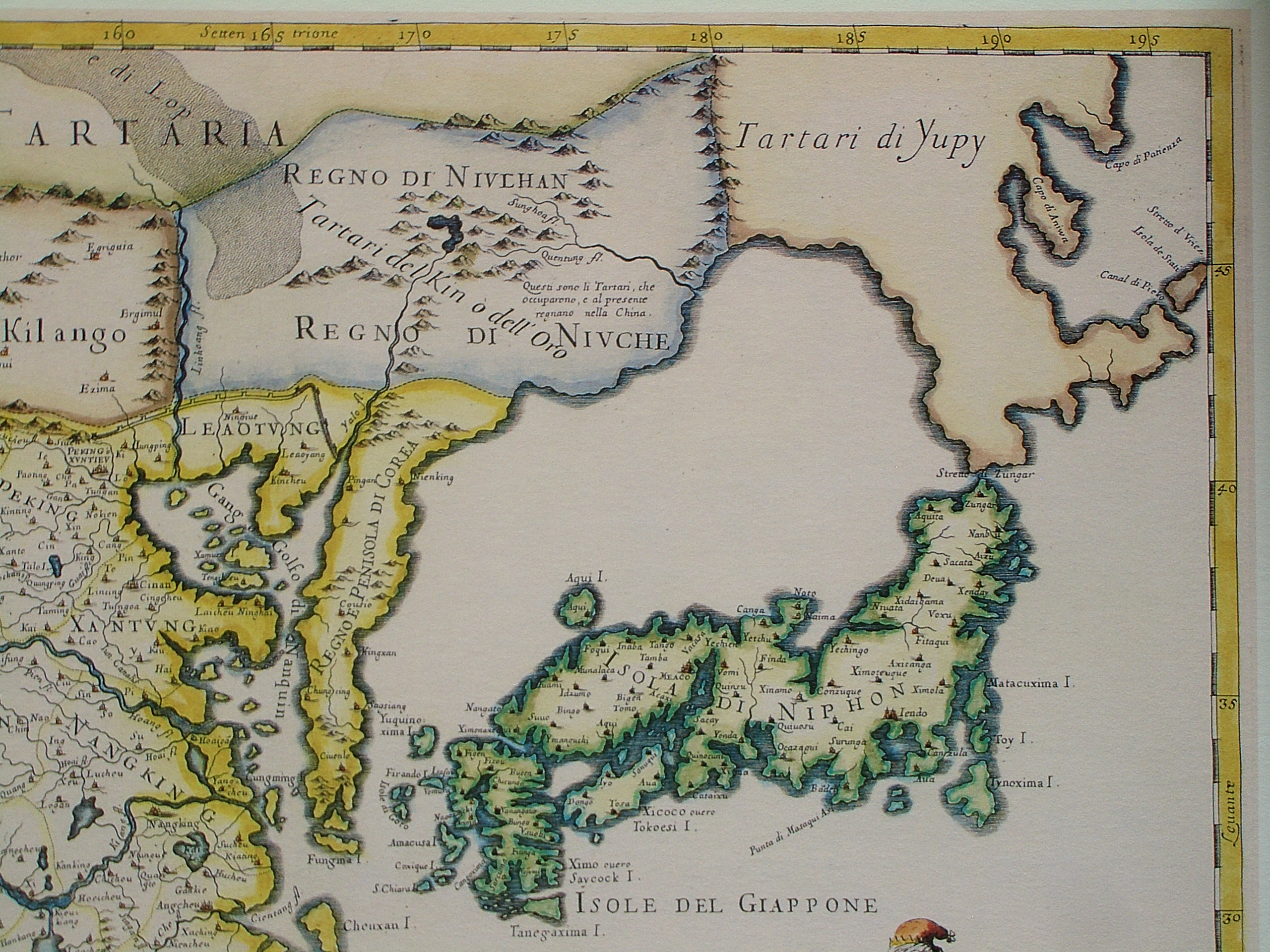
Cape of Aniva, Cape of Patience, Staten Island (Isola di Stati), and Strait of de Vries all seen on this Italian map from 1682. As the map shows, de Vries did not have a chance to discover either La Pérouse Strait or the Strait of Tartary, the mapmakers thus making Hokkaido and Sakhalin part of the mainland.

Maarten Gerritszoon Vries or Fries, also referred to as de Vries, (18 February 1589 in Harlingen, Netherlands – late 1647 at sea near Manila) was a 17th-century Dutch cartographer and explorer, the first Western European to leave an account of his visit to Ezo, Sakhalin, Kuril Islands and the Sea of Okhotsk.

Not much is known about the life of de Vries. He was probably born in Harlingen, Netherlands, in 1589 and spent many years in Taiwan. He is best remembered for his 1643 expedition to the north-western Pacific Ocean to discover the coast of Tartaria, on account of Anthony van Diemen, the governor in Batavia. This was the second expedition to look for legendary gold and silver islands in the Pacific, which nobody had discovered, after a failed expedition in 1639 under command of Matthijs Quast.

== De Vries expedition ==
The two ships, the Castricum under De Vries and the Breskens under Hendrick Cornelisz Schaep left Batavia, the capital of Dutch Java, in February 1643. After a stop in Ternate in the Moluccas they continued their journey on April 4, roughly two months later. The two ships lost touch with each other in a storm six weeks later, on May 20, while off Hachijo Shima, an island some 290 km south of Edo. The Dutch later named the island Ongeluckich or "Unlucky".

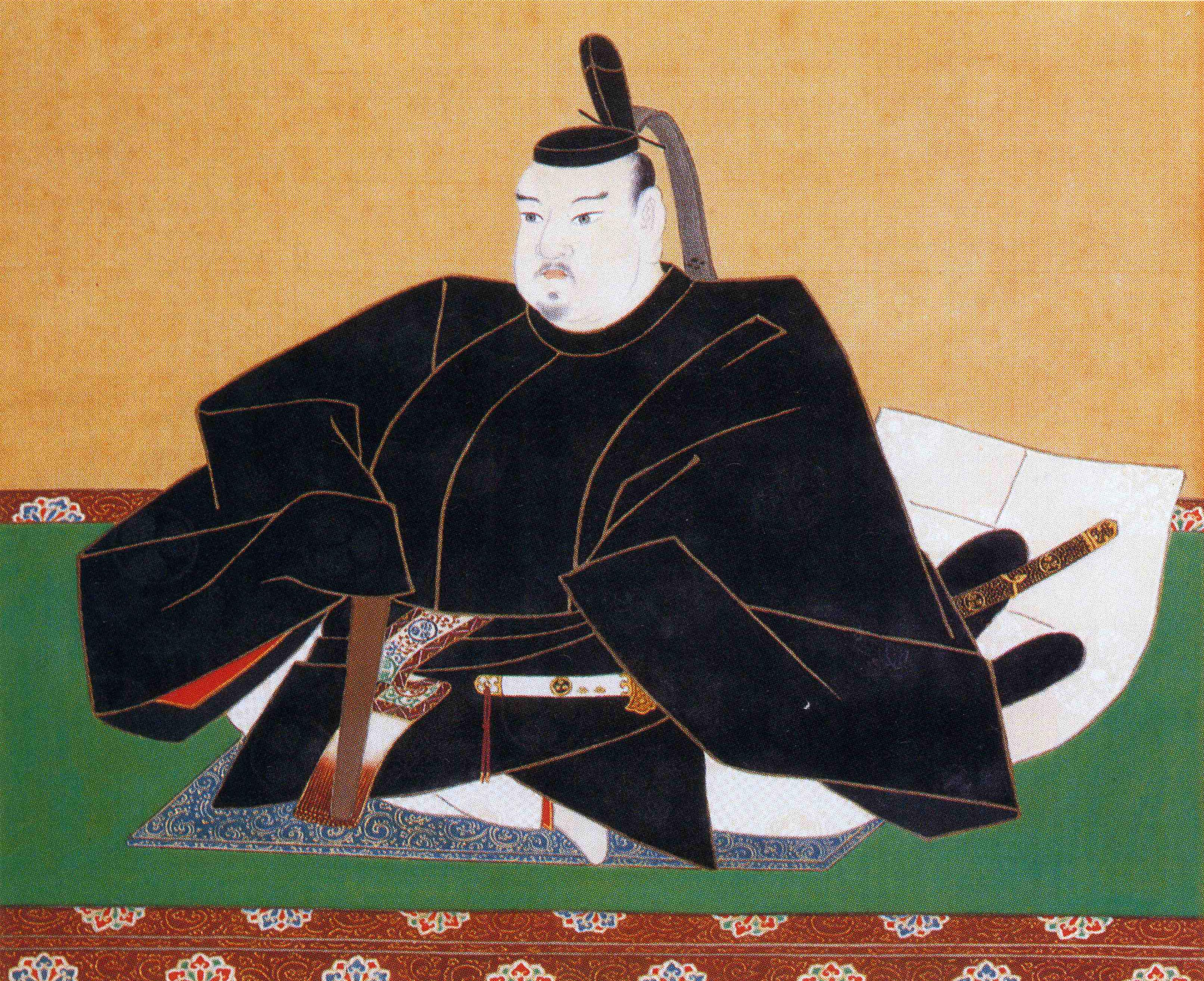
Tokugawa Iemitsu

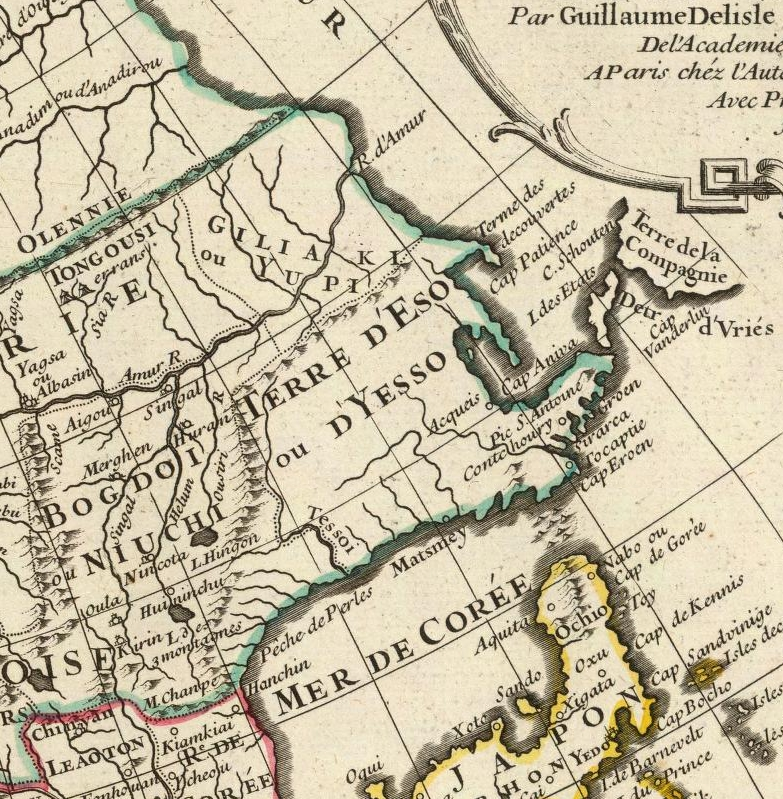
Early 18 c. French map depicting the Vries Strait and the Strait of Tartary.

=== Breskens in Yamada ===
The Breskens arrived in a promising bay and was received in a friendly manner by the population of Yamada on Tohoku, Japan.

Six weeks later the Breskens again sailed to Yamada, probably while they had a good time. In the evening they organized a party with a samurai and most probably some Japanese women. (It is not known what exactly happened, because the diary got lost in 1692, after Nicolaes Witsen received it.)

The next day, July 29, ten members of the crew, including the captain were invited by the women to come to a farm where they would receive fresh vegetables and fish. The unarmed crew was offered sake and rice, but captured, and sent to Morioka and Edo for interrogation.

The Japanese feared Portuguese / Spanish Jesuits had come to land. As a result, bakufu officials were extremely anxious about the problem of coastal defenses. However, after it was understood that the crew were Dutch merchants and not Catholics, the problem to be solved became one of deciding by which procedure the Dutch should be released. After Jan van Elserac had arrived, the shōgun Tokugawa Iemitsu sent them in December to Deshima.

The crew had to wait nine months for the next ship to Taiwan while the Breskens had left Honshu already at the end of July (without a captain) searching for the gold and silver Islands(ja).

== Castricum going north ==
In the summer of 1643, the Castricum sailed along the southern Kuril Islands, visiting Kunashir, Iturup (which they named "Staten Island", although nowadays this name is only used to refer to Staten Island, in New York City), and Urup, where they met with the Ainu, and which they named "Company Island" and claimed for the Netherlands. He also transcribed several sentences in what is the earliest written record in the Sakhalin Ainu language.

The Castricum passed between Iturup and Urup, the strait later becoming known as Vries Strait, and entered the Sea of Okhotsk.

The Dutch sailed north without encountering land until being driven south-west toward the northern shores of Hokkaido. They then sailed north again, visiting Cape Aniwa (the southeastern tip of Sakhalin Island), the Gulf of Patience - where they waited for fog to clear - and Cape Patience east of it. At these places they met and communicated through sign language with the Indigenous Ainu people of the island.

After another excursion east into the Pacific, the Castricum returned to Japanese waters and managed to meet the Breskens off Kyushu. The two ships sailed to Fort Zeelandia (Taiwan) and returned to Batavia in mid-December 1643.

The voyage also produced cartographic material that contributed to European knowledge of the seas north of Japan. A map of the discoveries made during the expedition was drawn by Vries in 1643. A later copy of this map, probably produced in the Amsterdam studio of the cartographic draftsman Johannes Vingboons between about 1665 and 1668, survives in the Blaeu–Van der Hem Atlas, one of the most extensive seventeenth-century collections of maps and charts. The map shows the route of the expedition and the islands encountered during the voyage, including Staten Island (now Urup), Company Island (now Iturup), and the strait later known as Vries Strait.

Illustrations and descriptions of the coastlines visited during the expedition were reproduced in later geographical works of the seventeenth century, introducing European readers to the geography of the Kuril region and helping shape early European mapping of the seas between Japan, Sakhalin, and the Kamchatka Peninsula.
