= Vries Strait =

Strait in the Kuril Islands

Coordinates: 45°30′20″N 149°10′36″E

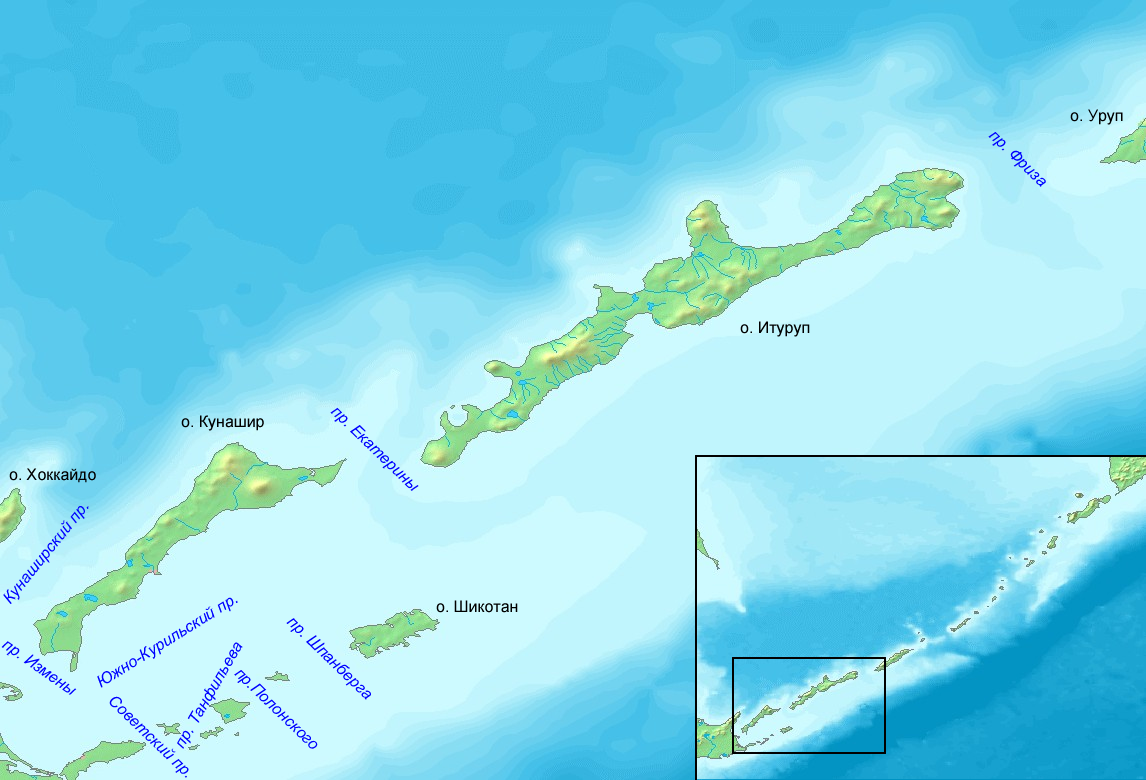
Vries Strait (пр.Фриза)

Vries Strait (Пролив Фриза, Proliv Friza), historically also known as the De Vries Strait, is a strait between two main islands of the Kurils. It is located between the northeastern end of the island of Iturup and the southwestern headland of Urup Island, connecting the Sea of Okhotsk on the west with the Pacific Ocean on the east. It has a width of 42 km.

== Name ==
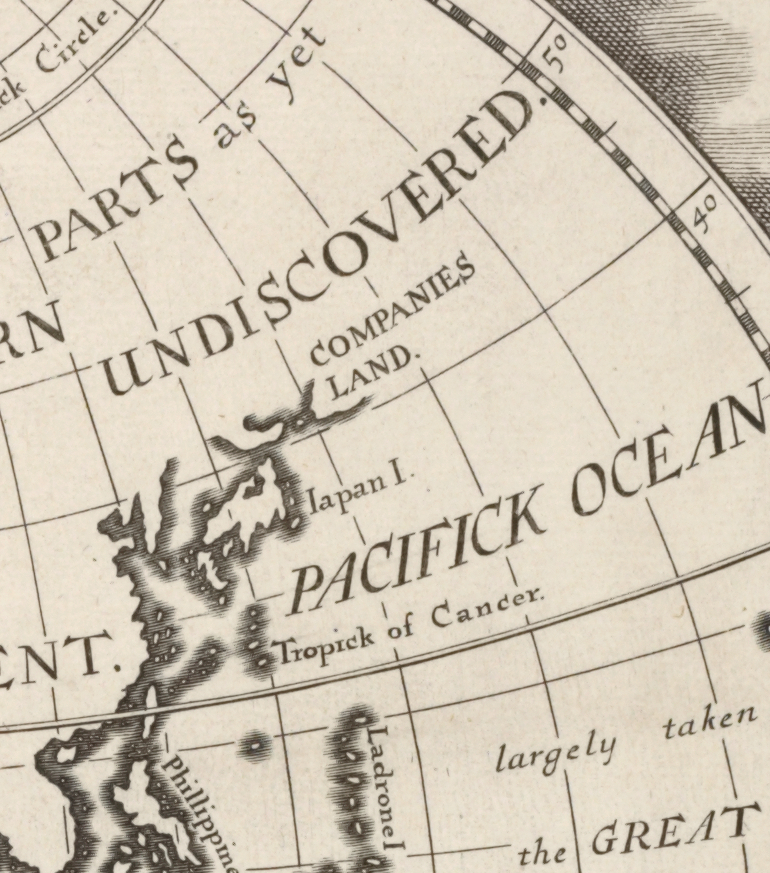
"Companies Land" on an English map from 1700. "Vries Strait" initially separated it from Staten Island or Hokkaido.

The Dutch sailor Maarten Gerritszoon Vries explored the seas north of Japan for the Dutch East India Company in 1643. Sometimes credited with making the first European contact with Urup and Iturup, he actually recorded exaggerated nonsense or phantom islands, claiming the region held the enormous continental Company Land—named after the VOC—and the large and prosperous Staten Island, named after the States General. "Vries Strait" was the imaginary body of water that separated these imaginary places. However, they both survived on European maps of the region for well over a century, even after Vitus Bering's lieutenant Martin Spanberg disproved their existence in anything like Vries's account. Nonetheless, having survived for so long on so many maps, the name was carried over to describe the extant strait between the actual islands in the area.

== Geography ==
The strait forms a major division in the plant life of the Kurils, called the Miyabe Line (Japanese: 宮部線, Miyabe-sen) by the Japanese botanist Kingo Miyabe.
