= Offshore islets of Urup =

The Offshore islets of Urup include several tiny islets and rocks scattered around the coast of Urup island, which in turn is a part of Greater Kuril Chain in Sakhalin Oblast of Russia.

Name	Area, km²	Maximum height, m	Latitude	Longitude
Taira islands	0,6	-	46°14′	150°36′
Shchetininoy	-	-	46°14′	150°35′
Marshala Vasilevskogo	-	-	46°13,9′	150°35,1′
Gromyko	-	-	46°14′	150°36′
Bliznetsy islands	0,3	95,1	46°13′	150°29′
Sanycha	0,17	95,1	46°13′	150°29′
Minervy	0,0548	-	46°13′	150°30′
Pivnaya Kruzhka	0,0075	-	46°13′	150°30′
Krab	0,06	30	45°38′	149°26′
Kuvshin	-	-	45°59′	149°54′
Petushkova	-	-	46°3′	149°59′
Chaika	-	-	46°13′	150°24′

== History ==
In 1855 the islets together with Urup were confirmed as part of Russian Empire on conditions of Treaty of Shimoda.

In 1875 they were incorporated into Empire of Japan on conditions of Treaty of Saint Petersburg.

After World War II the islets have become part of the USSR and then Russia. Many of them remained unnamed during the Soviet era, though previously they used to have Japanese names. Russian Geographical Society made expedition to the area in 2012 to generate ideas for naming further five islets which were officially given Russian names in 2017. Two of them, Gromyko and Schetininoy, are part of Urup's islets. In 2020 another one of Urup's islets was officially named after Aleksandr Vasilevsky who was Marshal of the Soviet Union.
