= Tri Sestry =

Stratovolcano on Urup Island, Russia

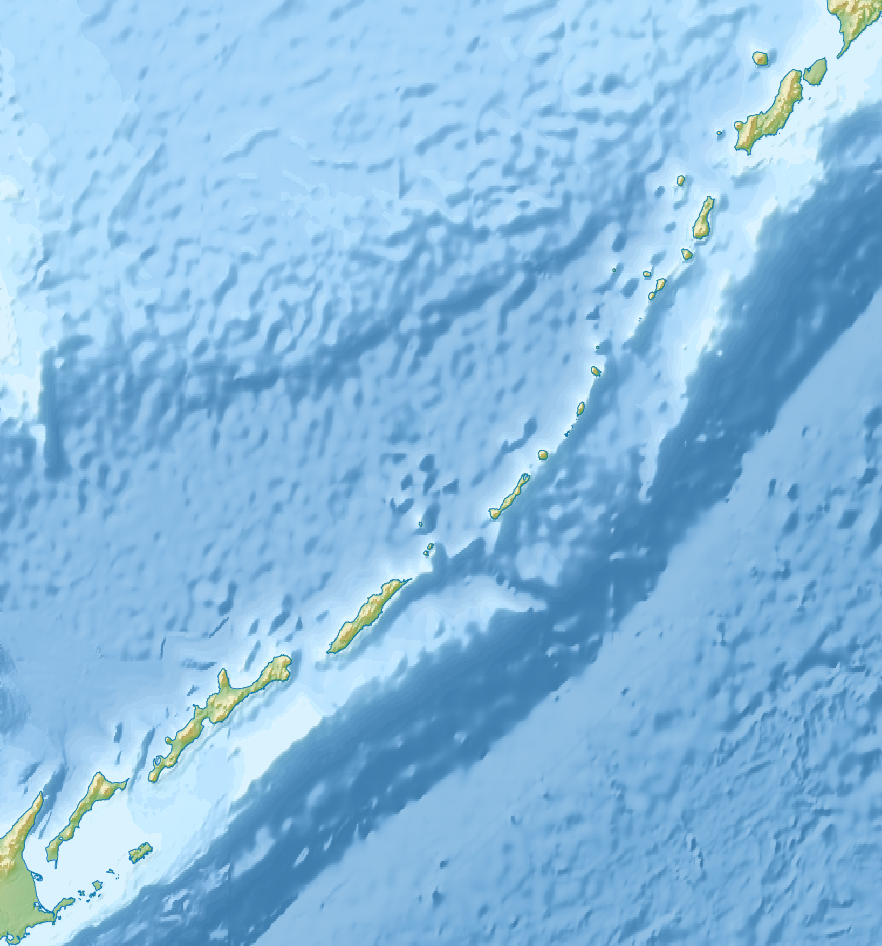
- Location within Russia Location within Kuril Islands

Highest point
- Elevation: 998 m (3,274 ft)
- Coordinates: 45.93°N 149.92°E

Geography
- Location: Urup, Kuril Islands, Russia

Geology
- Mountain type: Stratovolcano
- Last eruption: Unknown

Tri Sestry (Russian: Три Сестры, lit. 'the three sisters') is a stratovolcano located in the central part of Urup Island, Kuril Islands, Russia.

== See also ==
- List of volcanoes in Russia
