= Tymovskoye =

Tymovskoye Тымовское
- Urban-type settlement
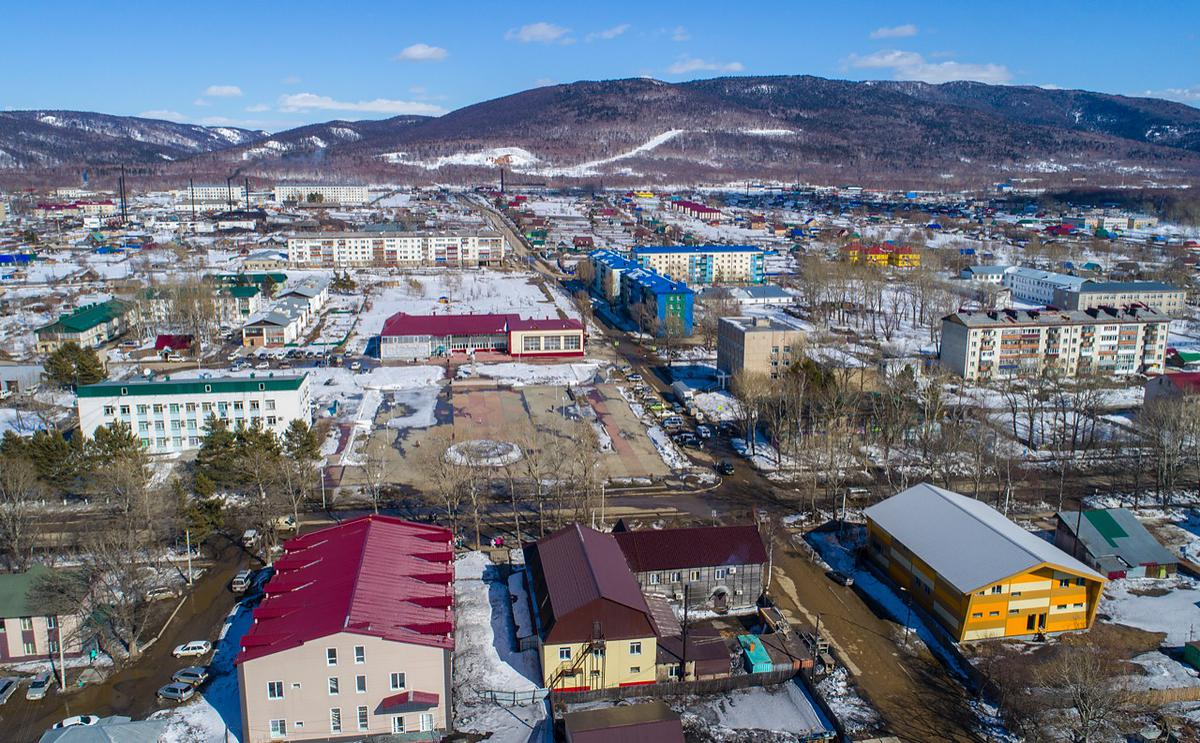

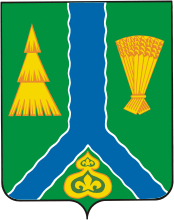
- Coat of arms
- Interactive map of Tymovskoye
- Location of Tymovskoye Tymovskoye (Sakhalin Oblast)
- Coordinates: 50°51′01″N 142°39′36″E
- Country: Russia
- Federal subject: Sakhalin Oblast
- Administrative district: Tymovsky District
- Founded: 1880
- Urban-type settlement status since: 1963

Population (2010 Census)
  - Total: 7,855
  - Estimate (2025): 8,657 (+10.2%)

Administrative status
  - Capital of: Tymovsky District

Municipal status
  - Urban okrug: Tymovsky Urban Okrug
  - Capital of: Tymovsky Urban Okrug
- Time zone: UTC+11 (MSK+8)
- Postal code: 694400
- Dialing code: +7 42447
- OKTMO ID: 64750000051

Tymovskoye (Russian: Ты́мовское) is an urban locality (an urban-type settlement) and the administrative center of Tymovsky District of Sakhalin Oblast, Russia, located in the central part of the Sakhalin Island on the right bank of the Tym River, about 450 kilometers (280 mi) north of Yuzhno-Sakhalinsk. Population: 7,855 (2010 census); 8,532 (2002 census); 10,869 (1989 Soviet census).

== History ==
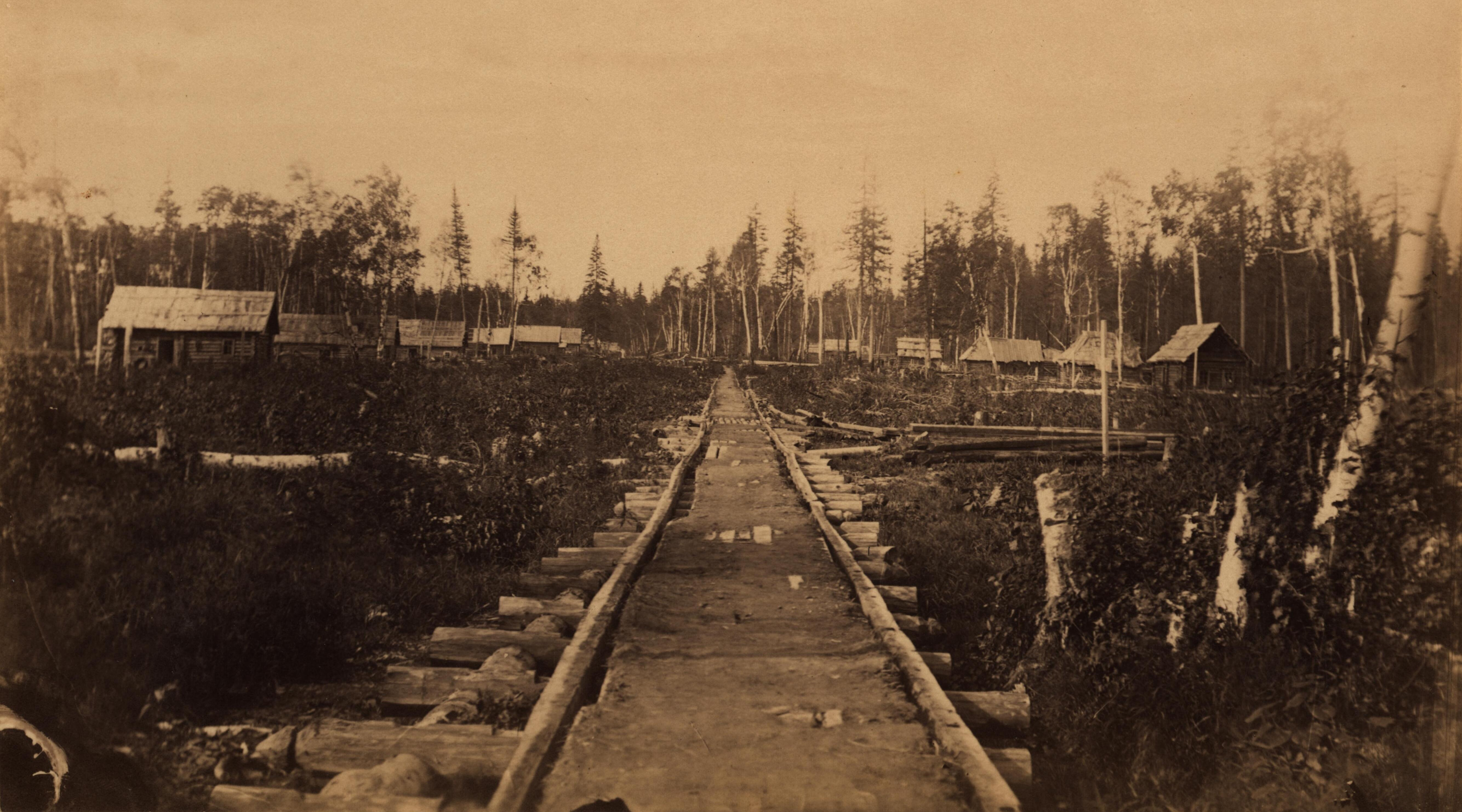
The village of Derbinskoye in the late 19th century

The original Nivkh name of the Tymy river comes from the words Tymy (smoke), which means a depression at the bottom of the river where fish spawns, and "and" is the river. Therefore, the name of the river can be translated as "spawning river."

In 1880 Derbinskoye (the original name of Tymovskoye) settlement for exiled convicts was founded, named after warden Derbin, who was killed by a prisoner for his cruel treatment. The writer Anton Chekhov visited Derbinskoye in 1890 during his travel through Sakhalin and described it in his book, Sakhalin Island. During the Russo-Japanese War of 1904–1905, the area around Derbinskoye was occupied by Japanese troops. They would again occupy the town during the Japanese occupation of northern Sakhalin in 1920. Following Japan's withdrawal, the USSR gained control over northern Sakhalin in May 1925.

Derbinskoye became the administrative center of Rykovsky District in 1928. The settlement was given its present name of November 15, 1949.

On November 15, 1949, Derbinskoye was renamed to Tymovskoye. Under Joseph Stalin, Tymovskoye was home to a prison camp of the gulag system. In 1950–1953, this particular camp was the base for forced labor used in the construction of a railway connecting the planned tunnel between Sakhalin and the Russian mainland with the existing Sakhalin rail network.

In 1963, Tymovskoye was granted urban-type settlement status.

== Administrative and municipal status ==
Within the framework of administrative divisions, Tymovskoye serves as the administrative center of Tymovsky District and is subordinated to it. As a municipal division, the urban-type settlement of Tymovskoye and twenty-four rural localities of Tymovsky District are incorporated as Tymovsky Urban Okrug.

== Economy ==
The main industries in the town today are timber production and food processing.

=== Transportation ===
The settlement is served by the narrow gauge Sakhalin Railway, with a station (named Tymovsk) on the line leading north towards Nogliki. Construction of the rail line reached Tymovskoye in the 1970s. The largest locomotive depot for the northern section of the rail line is located here.

The R487 road from Yuzhno-Sakhalinsk to Alexandrovsk-Sakhalinsky via Poronaysk also passes through Tymovskoye. The road to Nogliki and Okha on the east coast of the island also branches here, following the Tym downstream.

== Notable people ==
- Bronisław Piłsudski (1866–1918), Polish ethnologist, sentenced to fifteen years of forced labor for planned assassination of Tsar Alexander III, served part of his sentence in Rykovskoye.
