= Umm Shaif oil field =

Oil field in Abu Dhabi, UAE

Umm Shaif Oil Field
- Country: United Arab Emirates
- Region: Persian Gulf
- Offshore/onshore: offshore
- Operator: Abu Dhabi National Oil Company

Field history
- Discovery: 1962
- Start of production: 1963

Production
- Current production of oil: 300,000 barrels per day (~1.5×10^{7} t/a)
- Estimated oil in place: 550 million tonnes (~ 620×10^{6} m^{3} or 3900 million bbl)
- Estimated gas in place: 30,700×10^{9} cu ft (870×10^{9} m^{3})

The Umm Shaif Oil Field is an oil field in Abu Dhabi. It was discovered in 1958 and developed by Abu Dhabi Marine Areas, a joint venture between BP and Compagnie Française des Pétroles. The oil field is now operated and owned by Abu Dhabi National Oil Company. The total proven reserves of the Umm Shaif oil field are around 3.9 billion barrels (550 million tonnes), and production is centered on 300,000 barrels per day (48,000 m^{3}/d).

In July 2026, ADNOC and its international partners approved a US$6.2 billion investment to develop the Umm Shaif Gas Cap. The project was expected to produce more than 600 million standard cubic feet of natural gas and associated gas liquids per day from 2030. The partners included TotalEnergies, Eni and the China National Petroleum Corporation.
