= Ivao Group =

Cinder cones in Urup Island, Russia

- Location within Far Eastern Federal District

Highest point
- Elevation: 1,426 m (4,678 ft)
- Coordinates: 45.77°N 149.68°E

Geography
- Location: Urup, Kuril Islands, Russia

Geology
- Mountain type: Cinder cones
- Last eruption: Unknown

Ivao Group (Russian: Группа Ивао, romanized: Gruppa Ivao) is a group of cinder cones located in the southern part of the uninhabited, volcanic Urup Island, in the Kuril Archipelago, Russia.

== See also ==
- List of volcanoes in Russia
