= Gulf of Patience =

Bay in the Sea of Okhotsk, Russia

- Taraika Bay / Nintai-wan / Shichirō-wan
- Залив Терпения (Russian)
- Location in Sakhalin Oblast
- Location: Sakhalin Oblast, Russian Far East
- Coordinates: 49°N 143.5°E
- River sources: Poronay
- Ocean/sea sources: Sea of Okhotsk
- Basin countries: Russia
- Max. length: 65 km (40 mi)
- Max. width: 130 km (81 mi)
- Average depth: 50 m (160 ft)
- Settlements: Poronaysk

The Gulf of Patience is a large body of water off the southeastern coast of Sakhalin, Russia.

== Geography ==
The Gulf of Patience is located in the southern Sea of Okhotsk, between the main body of Sakhalin in the west and Cape Patience in the east. The Poronay flows into the bay from the north. Tyuleny Island lies off the eastern side of the bay to the south of Cape Patience.

== History ==
The first Europeans to visit the bay were the crew of the Dutch ship Castricum, captained by Maarten Gerritsz Vries, in 1643. They named the gulf in memory of their having to wait for the fog to clear in order for them to continue with their expedition.

== See also ==
- Poronaysk
