= Urup =

Uninhabited island in the Kuril Island chain

Native name: Уру́п (Russian); 得撫島 (Japanese); ウルㇷ゚ (Ainu)
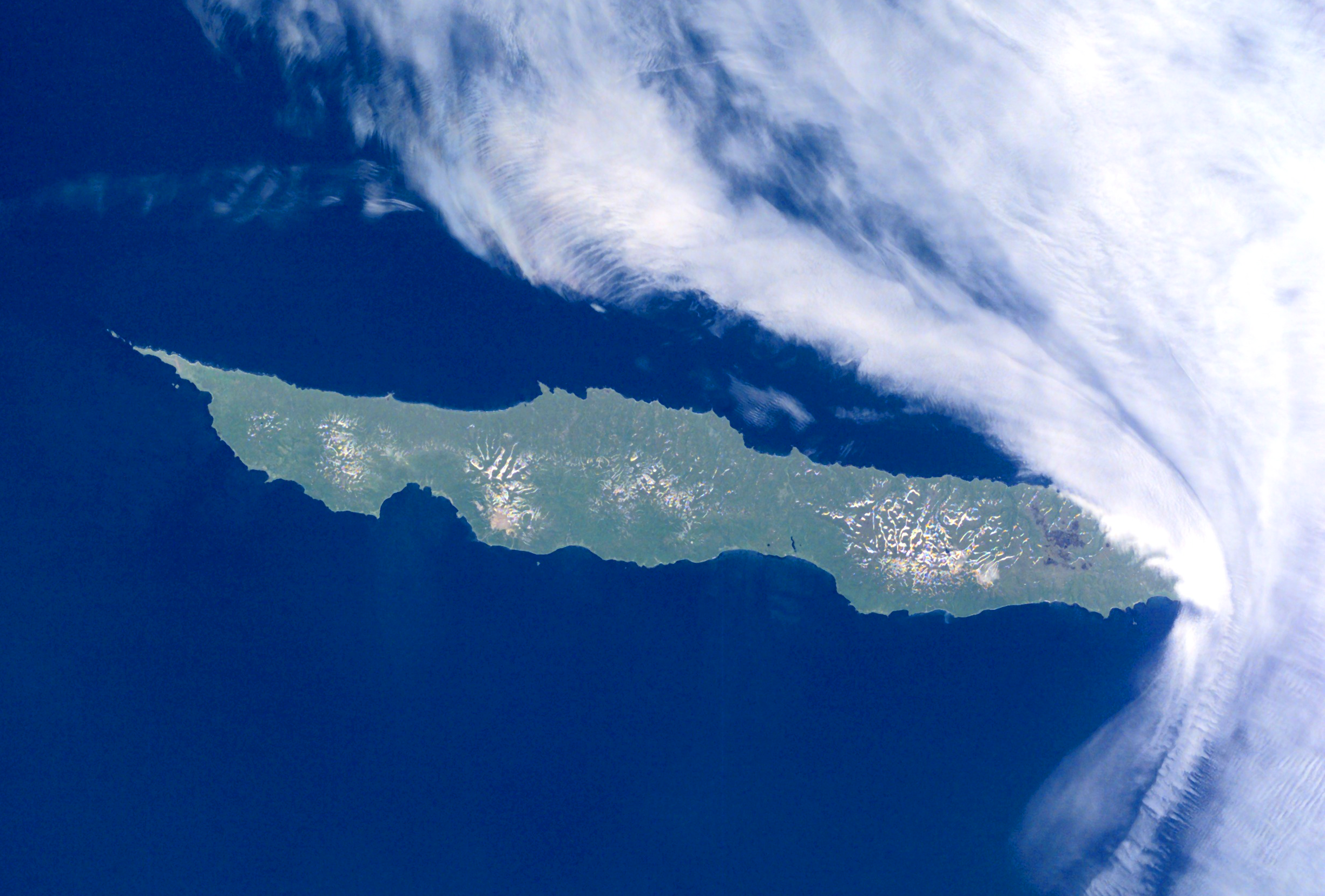
- July 2001 NASA photograph of Urup Island

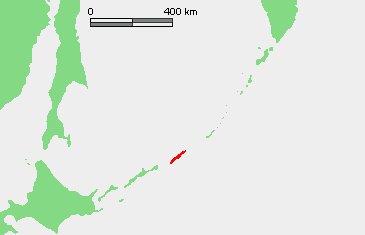

Geography
- Location: Sea of Okhotsk
- Coordinates: 45°56′N 150°02′E
- Archipelago: Kuril Islands
- Area: 1,430 km^{2} (550 sq mi)
- Highest elevation: 1,426 m (4678 ft)

Administration
- Russia

Demographics
- Population: 0 (2010)

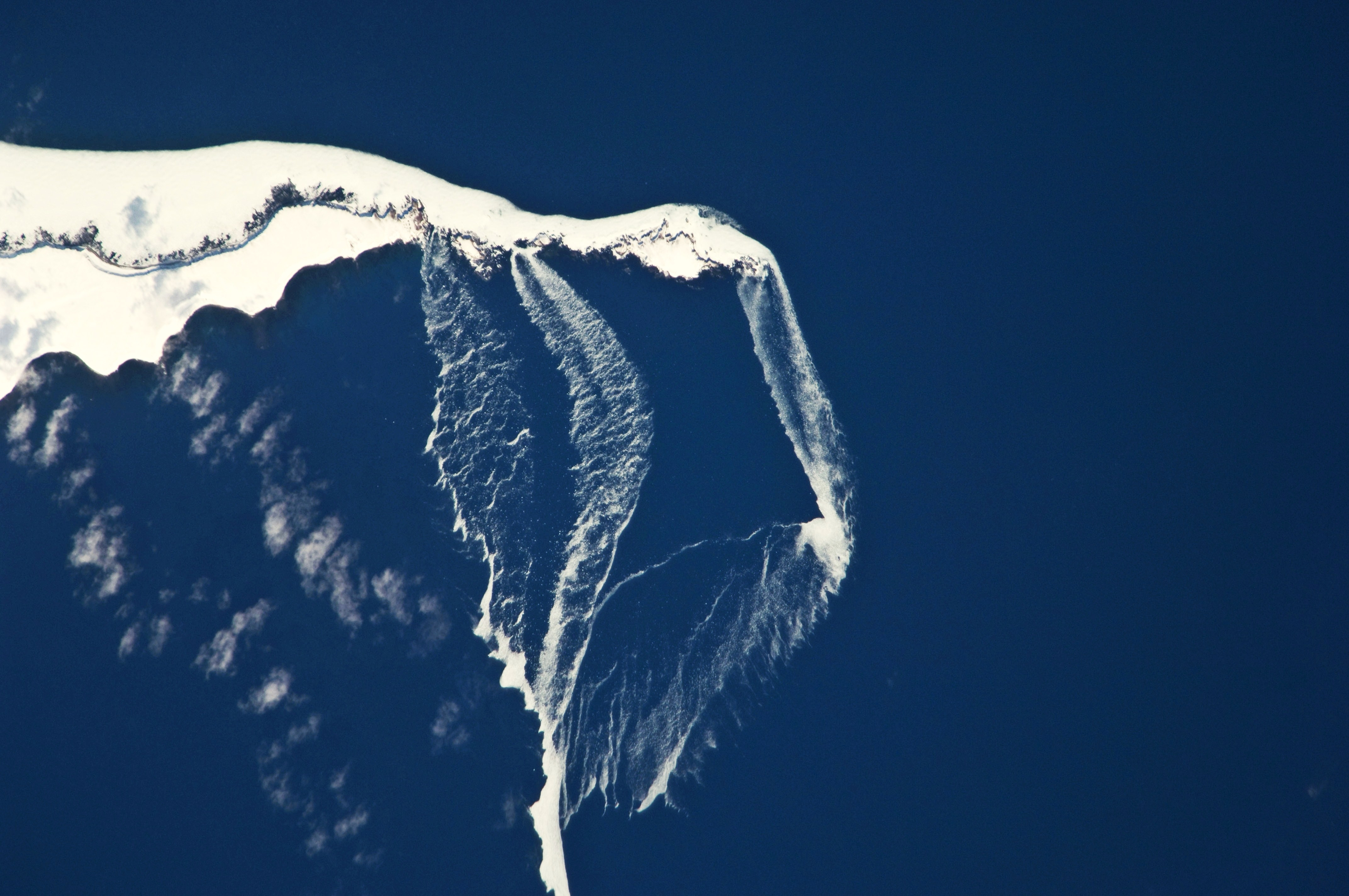
Ice floes off the north-eastern tip of the island.

Urup (Russian: Уру́п, romanized: Urúp, Japanese: 得撫島, romanized: Uruppu-tō, Ainu: ウルㇷ゚, romanized: Urup) is a volcanic island in the Kuril Islands chain in the south of the Sea of Okhotsk, northwest Pacific Ocean. Its name is derived from the Ainu language word urup, meaning "sockeye salmon". Historically, the island was populated and a Japanese garrison was present in the Second World War and then a Russian garrison. Today, the island is uninhabited although there are former mining operations on the island where temporary workers have resided. It is administered as part of the Sakhalin Oblast of the Russian Federation.

== Geography and climate ==
Urup is essentially rectangular in shape, with a long axis of 120 kilometers (75 miles) and a narrow axis of about 20 kilometers (12 miles). It is the fourth largest of the Kuril Islands, with an area of 1,430 square kilometres (552 square miles). The highest point is Gora Ivao at 1,426 metres (4,678 ft). A number of tiny islets and rocks are scattered around the coast of Urup.

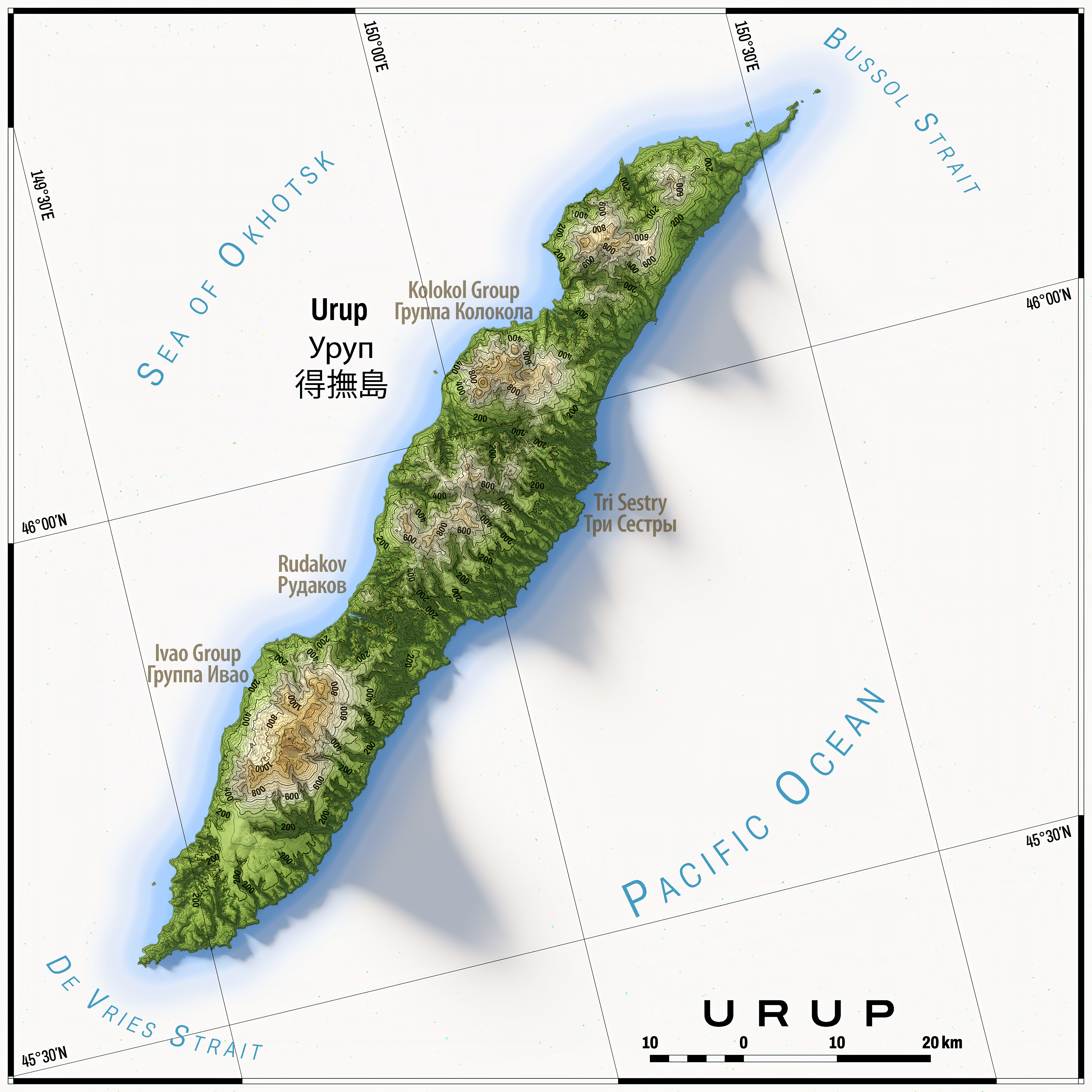
Topographic map of Urup island

The strait between Urup and Iturup is known as the Vries Strait, after Dutch explorer Maarten Gerritsz Vries, the first recorded European to explore the area. The strait between Urup and Simushir is known as Bussol Strait, after the French word for "compass", which was the name of one of French naval officer La Pérouse's vessels. This French mariner explored the area of the Kuril Islands in 1787.

Urup consists of four major groups of active or dormant stratovolcanos:

- Kolokol Group (Russian: Группа Колокола, romanized: Gruppa Kolokola; Japanese: 得撫富士, romanized: Uruppu-Fuji), with a height of 1,328 metres (4,357 ft) has erupted as recently as 1973.
- Rudakov (Russian: Рудаков; Japanese: 台場山, romanized: Daiba-zan), with a height of 524 metres (1,719 ft) has a 700-metre-wide (2,300-foot), funnel-like crater containing a 300-metre-wide (980-foot) lake
- Tri Sestry (Russian: Три Сестры; Japanese: 硫黄山, romanized: Io-zan), with a height of 998 metres (3,274 ft) has flanks cut by deep ravines and has numerous hot springs.
- Ivao Group (Russian: Группа Ивао, romanized: Gruppa Ivao; Japanese: 白妙山, romanized: Shiratae-zan), with a height of 1,426 metres (4,678 feet) is the highest point on the island. The southeast-most cone bisects a glacial valley, forming a lake.

Despite its temperate latitude, the cold Oyashio Current and powerful Aleutian Low combine to give Urup a subarctic climate (Köppen Dfc), that is close to a polar climate (Köppen ET) with mild, foggy summers and cold, snowy winters. In reality the climate resembles the subpolar oceanic climate of the Aleutian Islands much more than the hypercontinental climate of Siberia proper or Manchuria, but the February mean of −6.0 °C (21.2 °F) is well below the limit of "oceanic" climates. Urup, like all the Kuril islands, experiences extremely strong seasonal lag, with the highest temperatures in August and September, the lowest in February and temperatures typically in fact warmer at the autumn equinox than at the summer solstice.

Climate data for Urup (1953-1997 normals and extremes)
Month	Jan	Feb	Mar	Apr	May	Jun	Jul	Aug	Sep	Oct	Nov	Dec	Year
Record high °C (°F)	6.1 (43.0)	8.9 (48.0)	6.1 (43.0)	16.2 (61.2)	22.0 (71.6)	26.1 (79.0)	30.0 (86.0)	28.1 (82.6)	28.0 (82.4)	21.8 (71.2)	15.0 (59.0)	12.0 (53.6)	30.0 (86.0)
Mean daily maximum °C (°F)	−2.7 (27.1)	−3.7 (25.3)	−2.0 (28.4)	2.2 (36.0)	5.9 (42.6)	8.4 (47.1)	12.1 (53.8)	14.5 (58.1)	13.3 (55.9)	9.7 (49.5)	4.2 (39.6)	0.0 (32.0)	5.2 (41.4)
Daily mean °C (°F)	−5.0 (23.0)	−6.0 (21.2)	−4.3 (24.3)	−0.2 (31.6)	2.9 (37.2)	5.2 (41.4)	8.6 (47.5)	10.9 (51.6)	10.0 (50.0)	6.6 (43.9)	1.7 (35.1)	−2.3 (27.9)	2.3 (36.1)
Mean daily minimum °C (°F)	−7.3 (18.9)	−8.4 (16.9)	−6.6 (20.1)	−2.6 (27.3)	−0.1 (31.8)	2.1 (35.8)	5.1 (41.2)	7.3 (45.1)	6.6 (43.9)	3.6 (38.5)	−0.9 (30.4)	−4.6 (23.7)	−0.5 (31.1)
Record low °C (°F)	−18.0 (−0.4)	−19.0 (−2.2)	−20.0 (−4.0)	−11.5 (11.3)	−13.0 (8.6)	−3.5 (25.7)	−2.2 (28.0)	0.0 (32.0)	−3.0 (26.6)	−2.2 (28.0)	−9.0 (15.8)	−14.0 (6.8)	−20.0 (−4.0)
Average precipitation mm (inches)	106.7 (4.20)	79.3 (3.12)	84.8 (3.34)	100.8 (3.97)	98.2 (3.87)	75.3 (2.96)	92.4 (3.64)	107.0 (4.21)	158.0 (6.22)	149.5 (5.89)	142.7 (5.62)	129.8 (5.11)	1,324.6 (52.15)
Average precipitation days (≥ 1.0 mm)	22.0	18.1	14.7	11.5	11.5	10.3	11.6	13.3	12.5	14.1	19.5	21.9	180.8
Source: NOAA

== Fauna ==
In the spring and summer crested auklet, tufted puffin, and pigeon guillemot nest on the island; there is also a colony of black-legged kittiwake.

== History ==
=== Prehistory ===
The first attested inhabitants of Urup are the Ainu, the indigenous people of the Kurils, southern Sakhalin, and Hokkaido.

=== Age of Exploration ===
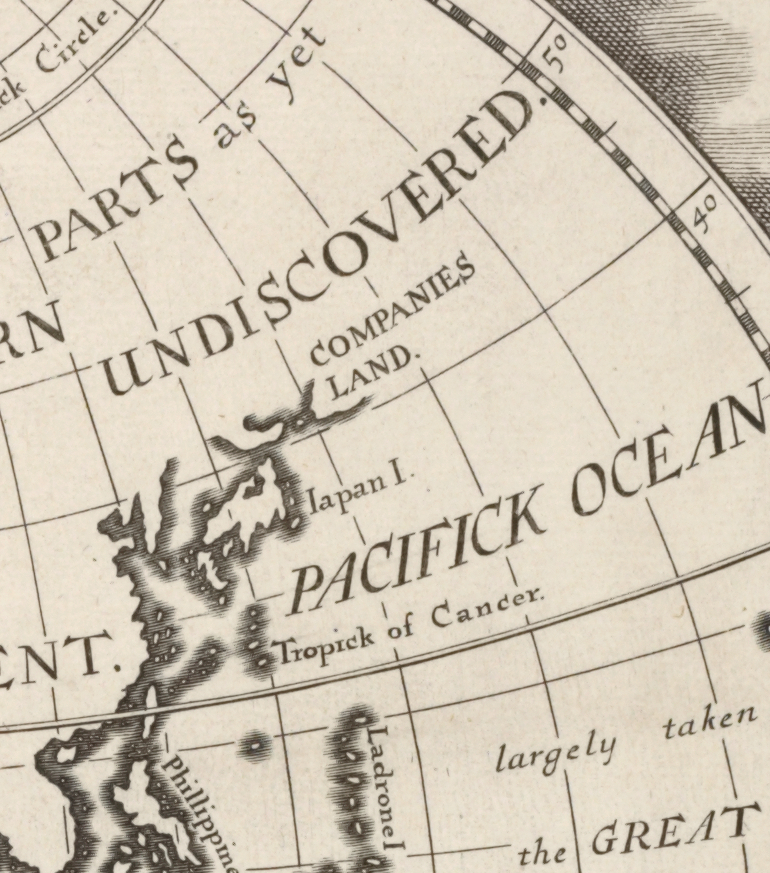
A map from 1700 displaying "Companies Land" as a major island or continental extension northeast of Honshu in Japan

The Castricum under Maarten Gerritsz Vries was the first recorded European vessel to reach this part of the Kurils, arriving in 1643 while exploring Hokkaido and the surrounding area for the Dutch East India Company (VOC). Vries's garbled account of the islands during an era when longitude was difficult to calculate was the origin of the large phantom island Company Land (Dutch: Companies Landt; French: Terre de la Compagnie) that subsequently appeared on European maps at various positions northeast of Honshu. Named in reference to the VOC, it was considered by Vries to be the northwesternmost projection of North America and its appearance on the maps of the respected cartographers Jan Janssonius, Nicolas Sanson, and Guillaume Delisle spread it through other European maps for another century before more accurate surveys became generally accepted. The original location of Vries's landing is sometimes specifically located on Urup.

Urup is first clearly shown on an official Japanese map of 1644, identifying it as part of the territories of the Matsumae clan, a feudal domain of Edo Japan.

=== 18th century ===
The Matsumae clan holdings were officially confirmed by the Tokugawa shogunate in 1715 and administration of the island came under the Matsumae domain’s regional office location on Kunashir from 1756. Meanwhile, three voyages of Vitus Bering's lieutenant Martin Spanberg in 1738, 1739, and 1742 pointedly failed to find any evidence of Rica de Oro, Rica de Plata, Staten Island, or Company Land in any of the areas claimed for them.

Russian fur traders appeared in the late 18th century, hunting sea otter and seizing foreign ships in the area. There were clashes between the Russians and the Ainu in 1772, and the Russians left for a time, but soon returned. G.F. Muller’s Voyages & Découvertes faites par les Russes (Amsterdam, 1766) contained a list and description of the Kuril Islands, including Urup whose people were said to trade with the Japanese but were not under their control. A small Russian presence was established on Urup by the fur trader Ivan Chernyi in 1768, acting on instructions from the governor of Siberia. During the 1770s it was the base for attempts to establish trade with the Japanese on Yezo (Hokkaido) which came to an end when it was destroyed by a tsunami in June 1780.

=== 19th century ===
During the decade following 1795, a party of 40 Russian men and women under Zvezdochetov established a colony they called "Slavorossiia" on Urup. In 1801, the Japanese government officially claimed control of the island, incorporating it into Ezo Province (now Hokkaidō Prefecture). This led to a series of clashes with Imperial Russia over Urup and the other Kurils, and sovereignty initially passed to Russia under the terms of the Treaty of Shimoda in 1855. The same year, in an effort to find the Russian fleet in the Pacific Ocean during the Crimean War, a French-British naval force reached the port of Hakodate (open to British ships as a result of the Anglo-Japanese Friendship Treaty of 1854), and sailing further north, landed on Urup, taking official possession of the island as "l'Isle de l'Alliance" and nominating a local Aleut inhabitant as provisional governor. The Treaty of Paris restituted the island to Russian control.

Three whaleships have been wrecked near or on the island: one in 1853 and two in 1855. On the night of 27–28 April 1853, the ship Susan (349 tons), of Nantucket, was stove by ice and sank in Bussol Strait while attempting to enter the Sea of Okhotsk. Two men were lost, one drowning and the other perishing on the ice. The remaining twenty-five crew members crowded into two whaleboats and reached Urup on the afternoon of 29 April. Here they spent eight days before being rescued by the barque Black Warrior, of New London. On 14 May 1855, the ships King Fisher (425 tons), and Enterprise (291 tons), both of New Bedford, were wrecked on a reef on the northeast end of the island while attempting to pass through Bussol Strait into the Sea of Okhotsk. All hands were saved.

==== Occupation of Urup by Great Britain and France ====
In 1855, during the Crimean War (1853–56), Britain and France occupied Urup, as part of their aggressive policy against Russian settlements in the Far East.

At the onset of the war, both sides were eager to secure their positions regarding Japan, the Russians sought rights in Japanese ports for their own ships and aimed to delineate the frontier between the two nations in the Kurils. The Treaty of Shimoda, signed on 7 February 1855, achieved this by establishing the boundary between the Japanese island of Iturup and the Russian island of Urup.

Simultaneously, the Anglo-Japanese Friendship Treaty was signed. This agreement, negotiated by Rear-Admiral Sir James Stirling, allowed British ships access to the ports of Nagasaki and Hakodate for repairs, provisions, and other supplies. This strategic advantage enabled the allies to use these ports as bases for launching attacks on Russian settlements in the Far East. This was particularly advantageous, given that the next nearest British base was in Hong Kong. Stirling gathered intelligence on Russian settlements in the Kurils. Consequently, an attack on Urup was initiated, aiming to reduce a reported Russian settlement and establish a naval base more firmly under allied control than those accessible in Japan.

During the Crimean War, the island was inhabited by the Ainu, with a few Russian and Aleut residents working for the Russian-American company. This company, responsible for the Russian territory of Alaska, fur trading activities in the Kurils and the Pacific coast of Siberia, shared a common interest with the British Hudson's Bay Company. A meeting in London led both companies to persuade their respective governments to agree to a neutrality pact concerning their North American settlements, resulting in the British refraining from attacking Alaska during the Crimean War.

The main Russian settlement on the island was Tavano, to which an Anglo-French force arrived in late August 1855, led by the British HMS Pique and the French frigate Sybille. Captain F. W. E. Nicolson was assigned to lead this mission, even after his defeat at the Siege of Petropavlovsk. At Tavano, Allied ships were delayed in making port due to thick fog and changeable winds. Captain Nicolson, anchored outside of the harbor, finding it unsuitable. Nicolson described the village of Tavano as consisting of wooden houses and storehouses used by the few Russians on the island, along with huts used by native. Despite the absence of a Russian garrison, local residents assured Nicolson of their departure before the allies' arrival.

On September 2 an "annexation ceremony" occurred on the island. The ceremony included the illegitimate renaming of the island to "l'Isle de l'Alliance" and the raising of the Union Jack and French flag. The capture of Urup marked the conclusion of Allied operations in the Pacific Theatre of the Crimean War, the allies left Urup the next day marking the end the Allied Occupation.

==== Japanese Annexation of Urup ====
Under the Treaty of Saint Petersburg of 1875, sovereignty passed to the Empire of Japan along with the rest of the Kuril islands. The island was formerly administered as part of Uruppu District of Nemuro Subprefecture of Hokkaido. The remaining local (mainly Aleut) inhabitants were transferred to Kamchatka, according to their will, and replaced by the Japanese colonists.

=== 20th century ===
During World War II, all civilian inhabitants of the island were relocated to the Japanese home islands, and towards the end of the war, the Imperial Japanese Army stationed approximately 6,000 troops on Urup, including the IJA 129th Independent Mixed Brigade, 5th Independent Tank Company, 23rd Independent AA Company, 80th Airfield Battalion and 6th Disembarkation Unit. During the Invasion of the Kuril Islands by the Soviet Union after the end of World War II, Japanese forces on Urup surrendered without resistance.

In 1952, upon signing the Treaty of San Francisco, Japan renounced its claim to the island. Soviet Border Troops occupied the former Japanese military facilities. As early as the 1950s, a P-14 radar "Tall King" VHF air defense radar existed on the far northeastern tip of Urup Island. A lighthouse was built on Mys Kastrikum (the easternmost cape) by Soviet authorities, as well as another on the western cape, Mys Chyeryepakha. The troops were withdrawn upon the dissolution of the Soviet Union in 1991, the co-located airfield was turned into a bombing range.

=== 21st century ===
The island is now largely uninhabited, except for a gold and silver mine, KurilGeo, formerly owned by the Solway Group and reportedly sold to an Armenian company in 2022. The island is administered as part of the Sakhalin Oblast of the Russian Federation.

== See also ==
- List of islands of Russia

== Bibliography ==
- De Saint-Martin, Vivien; et al., eds. (1895). "Yèso". Nouveau Dictionnaire de Géographie Universelle (in French). Vol. 7. Paris: Librairie Hachette & Co. p. 441–445..
- Wroth, Lawrence C. (1944). "The Early Cartography of the Pacific". The Papers of the Bibliographical Society of America. Vol. 38. Chicago: University of Chicago Press. pp. 87–231 & 233–268. JSTOR 24301919..
