= Bussol Strait =

Body of water in the Kuril Islands

Coordinates: 46°40′N 151°51′E

The Bussol Strait (Russian: Proliv Bussol), known in Japan as the North Urup Channel (北得撫水道, Kita Uruppu Suidō), is a wide strait that separates the islands of Broutona and Chirpoy to the west from Simushir to the east. It is nearly 58 km (about 36 mi) wide, making it the largest channel in the Kuril Islands.

It is named after the frigate Boussole.

== History ==
The strait was a popular route in the 1840s for American whaleships entering and exiting the Sea of Okhotsk on their way to and from cruises for right whales. It was rarely used from the 1850s to the 1870s when ships primarily cruised to the north for bowhead whales, using the more convenient Fourth Kuril Strait further north instead. Among the few to use it during that period was the ship Susan (349 tons), of Nantucket, which was stove by ice and sank in the strait on the night of 27–28 April 1853 while attempting to enter the Sea of Okhotsk. Two men were lost, one drowning and the other perishing on the ice. The remaining twenty-five crew members crowded into two whaleboats and reached Urup on the afternoon of 29 April. Here they spent eight days before being rescued by the barque Black Warrior, of New London. Two other whaleships were also lost in the strait. Early on the morning of 14 May 1855 the ships Enterprise (291 tons), under Captain Stephen G. Russell, and King Fisher (425 tons), under Captain Martin Palmer, both of New Bedford, were wrecked on a reef on the northeast end of Urup within a quarter mile of each other while attempting to enter the Sea of Okhotsk via Bussol Strait. All hands were saved after spending three days ashore Urup by the Bremen ship Joseph Hayden and the New London ship Montezuma. The two ships were sold at auction to the first and second mates of the Montezuma, respectively, but little was saved of the cargo. With the revival of cruises for right whales in the southern part of the sea in the 1880s ships began to use it again. It was utilized as late as 1902.
