= Patience Peninsula =

Peninsula on Sakhalin Island, Russia

Coordinates: 48°54′N 144°35′E

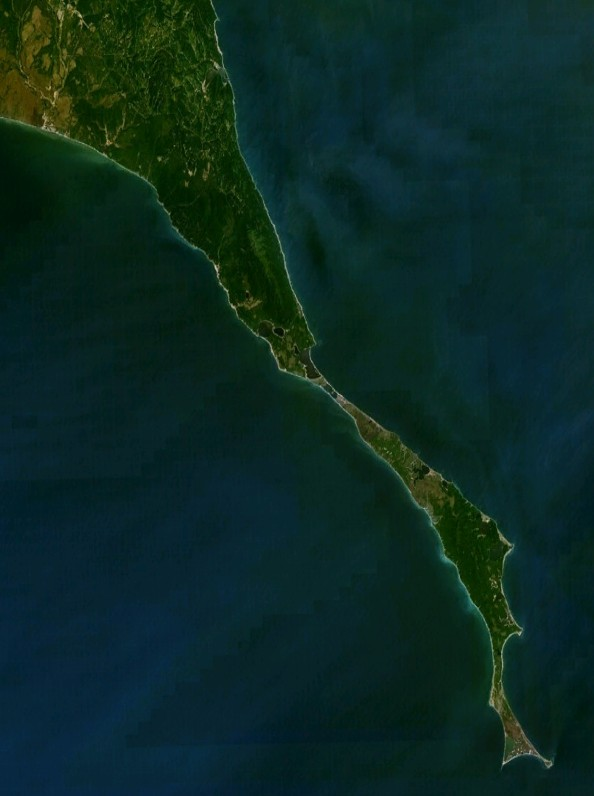
View of Cape Patience from space.

This map shows Poronaysky District; Cape Patience is the skinny peninsula in the southeastern part.

Cape Patience (Russian: Полуостров Терпения, Poluostrov Terpeniya) is a peninsula protruding 65 km (40 mi) km of east-central Sakhalin Island into the Sea of Okhotsk. It forms the eastern boundary of the Gulf of Patience. The width of the peninsula varies from less than 1 km (0.62 mi), at the Lodochniy Isthmus, to 30 km (19 mi) at its widest point. It reaches a maximum elevation of 350 m (1,150 ft). The cape is the southernmost extension (on land) of the East Sakhalin Mountains, a north-south range that runs along the eastern side of Sakhalin Island.

There is a small lighthouse at the end of the cape, which was built in 1953.

== Climate ==
Climate data for Cape Patience
Month	Jan	Feb	Mar	Apr	May	Jun	Jul	Aug	Sep	Oct	Nov	Dec	Year
Record high °C (°F)	2.2 (36.0)	2.5 (36.5)	5.1 (41.2)	13.9 (57.0)	21.1 (70.0)	26.1 (79.0)	25.0 (77.0)	28.9 (84.0)	26.1 (79.0)	18.9 (66.0)	12.2 (54.0)	6.1 (43.0)	28.9 (84.0)
Mean daily maximum °C (°F)	−9.1 (15.6)	−8.7 (16.3)	−4 (25)	0.9 (33.6)	4.0 (39.2)	8.1 (46.6)	12.1 (53.8)	14.8 (58.6)	13.3 (55.9)	8.6 (47.5)	1.6 (34.9)	−4.7 (23.5)	3.1 (37.5)
Daily mean °C (°F)	−11.5 (11.3)	−11.7 (10.9)	−6.7 (19.9)	−1.2 (29.8)	2.0 (35.6)	5.8 (42.4)	9.9 (49.8)	12.3 (54.1)	11.2 (52.2)	6.6 (43.9)	−0.5 (31.1)	−6.9 (19.6)	0.8 (33.4)
Mean daily minimum °C (°F)	−14 (7)	−14.6 (5.7)	−9.5 (14.9)	−3.2 (26.2)	−0.1 (31.8)	3.5 (38.3)	7.7 (45.9)	9.8 (49.6)	9.0 (48.2)	4.6 (40.3)	−2.7 (27.1)	−9.1 (15.6)	−1.6 (29.2)
Record low °C (°F)	−27.9 (−18.2)	−29.1 (−20.4)	−23.4 (−10.1)	−18.5 (−1.3)	−7 (19)	−4.7 (23.5)	-0 (32)	3.6 (38.5)	1.1 (34.0)	−5.4 (22.3)	−14.9 (5.2)	−25.8 (−14.4)	−29.1 (−20.4)
Average precipitation mm (inches)	32.8 (1.29)	25.7 (1.01)	29.5 (1.16)	28.4 (1.12)	38.9 (1.53)	32.2 (1.27)	54.8 (2.16)	66.6 (2.62)	76.1 (3.00)	61.1 (2.41)	49.6 (1.95)	38.9 (1.53)	534.6 (21.05)
Average precipitation days (≥ 1.0 mm)	6.6	5.3	6.3	5.6	6.5	5.4	6.1	7.0	7.5	9.0	9.4	8.3	83
Source 1: Météo climat stats Météo Climat
Source 2: Roshydromet (records)
