= Foreign relations of Eritrea =

The foreign relations of Eritrea are the policies of the Eritrean government by which it administers its external relations with other nations. Since its independence, Eritrea's foreign relations have been dominated by conflict and confrontation, both in the regional and international arenas. It has maintained often troubled, and usually violent, relations with its neighbors, including brief armed conflicts with Yemen and Djibouti and a destructive war with its bigger-neighbour, Ethiopia. At present, Eritrea has very tense relations with neighboring Ethiopia and Djibouti. Relations in the international arena also have been strained since the last decade, particularly with major powers. What appeared cordial relations with the US in the 1990s turned acrimonious following the border war with Ethiopia, 1998-2000. Although the two nations have a close working relationship regarding the ongoing war on terror, there has been a growing tension in other areas. Ties with international organizations such as the United Nations, the African Union, and the European Union have also been complicated in part because of Eritrea's outrage at their reluctance to force Ethiopia to accept a boundary commission ruling issued in 2002.

== International organizations ==
Eritrea is a member of the United Nations, the African Union, and is an observing member of the Arab League.

Eritrea holds a seat on the United Nations' Advisory Committee on Administrative and Budgetary Questions (ACABQ).

Eritrea also holds memberships in the International Bank for Reconstruction and Development, International Finance Corporation, International Criminal Police Organization (INTERPOL), Non-Aligned Movement, Organisation for the Prohibition of Chemical Weapons, Permanent Court of Arbitration, Port Management Association of Eastern and Southern Africa, and the World Customs Organization.

== Diplomatic relations ==
List of countries which Eritrea maintains diplomatic relations with:

#	Country	Date
—	Ethiopia (suspended)	22 May 1993
1	Yemen	23 May 1993
2	Argentina	24 May 1993
3	Italy	24 May 1993
4	Russia	24 May 1993
5	South Korea	24 May 1993
6	Sudan	24 May 1993
7	North Korea	25 May 1993
8	Finland	28 May 1993
9	Bulgaria	31 May 1993
10	United States	11 June 1993
11	Mexico	23 June 1993
12	United Arab Emirates	28 June 1993
13	Qatar	5 July 1993
14	Djibouti	11 July 1993
15	China	14 July 1993
16	Jordan	15 July 1993
17	Poland	15 July 1993
18	Vietnam	20 July 1993
19	Sweden	24 June 1993
20	Indonesia	2 August 1993
21	Germany	3 August 1993
22	Ivory Coast	4 August 1993
23	Egypt	9 August 1993
24	Hungary	24 August 1993
25	Japan	31 August 1993
26	Lebanon	3 September 1993
27	Kenya	14 September 1993
28	India	17 September 1993
29	Denmark	28 September 1993
30	Spain	5 October 1993
31	Kuwait	20 October 1993
32	Tunisia	25 October 1993
33	Israel	28 October 1993
34	Canada	28 October 1993
35	United Kingdom	16 November 1993
36	Saudi Arabia	20 November 1993
37	Romania	23 November 1993
38	Australia	24 November 1993
39	Pakistan	1 December 1993
40	Thailand	7 December 1993
41	Singapore	15 December 1993
42	Ukraine	20 December 1993
43	Czech Republic	6 January 1994
44	Namibia	28 January 1994
45	Uganda	28 January 1994
46	Austria	9 March 1994
47	Norway	14 March 1994
48	Switzerland	22 March 1994
49	France	23 March 1994
50	Algeria	25 March 1994
51	Belgium	31 March 1994
52	Oman	30 April 1994
53	Syria	April 1994
54	Morocco	30 May 1994
55	Turkey	30 June 1994
56	Netherlands	15 July 1994
57	Zambia	15 July 1994
58	Armenia	16 October 1994
59	Colombia	22 December 1994
60	Slovakia	26 February 1995
61	South Africa	17 March 1995
62	Portugal	8 June 1995
63	Greece	9 June 1995
64	Zimbabwe	9 June 1995
—	Holy See	15 July 1995
65	Bahrain	2 December 1995
66	Slovenia	4 April 1996
67	Luxembourg	13 September 1996
68	Bosnia and Herzegovina	17 September 1996
69	Brazil	7 November 1996
70	Cuba	8 November 1996
71	Philippines	4 February 1997
72	Malaysia	2 December 1997
73	Libya	5 February 1998
74	Lithuania	29 August 1998
75	Belarus	11 September 1998
76	Nigeria	1998
77	Croatia	4 June 1999
78	New Zealand	2 December 1999
—	Sovereign Military Order of Malta	1999
79	North Macedonia	13 September 2000
80	Cyprus	6 August 2001
81	Somalia	12 February 2002
82	Ireland	13 March 2002
83	Seychelles	25 April 2002
84	Venezuela	7 April 2004
85	Azerbaijan	20 April 2004
86	Mauritius	21 April 2004
87	Brunei	13 May 2004
88	Ghana	26 August 2004
89	Iceland	6 October 2004
90	Estonia	31 May 2005
91	Tajikistan	19 September 2005
92	San Marino	28 October 2005
93	Iran	31 May 2007
94	Tanzania	13 July 2007
95	Dominican Republic	28 September 2007
96	Sri Lanka	15 November 2007
97	Montenegro	18 March 2008
98	Malta	18 December 2008
99	Cambodia	2 February 2010
100	Paraguay	March 2010
101	Fiji	12 April 2010
102	Solomon Islands	27 June 2011
103	South Sudan	11 July 2011
104	Mali	16 February 2012
105	Georgia	24 February 2012
106	Angola	11 March 2012
107	Latvia	5 April 2012
108	Serbia	19 October 2012
109	Mozambique	10 December 2012
110	Ecuador	13 March 2013
111	Mongolia	24 March 2013
112	Kyrgyzstan	27 February 2014
113	Senegal	10 October 2014
114	Lesotho	21 June 2015
115	Mauritania	16 August 2015
116	Kazakhstan	7 December 2016
117	Eswatini	30 March 2017
118	Madagascar	12 April 2017
119	Rwanda	18 April 2017
120	Malawi	20 July 2017
121	Nepal	31 October 2017
122	Guinea	8 February 2019
123	Nicaragua	6 June 2019
124	Maldives	10 February 2021
125	Dominica	11 May 2021
126	Chad	12 October 2021
127	Jamaica	17 November 2023
128	Niger	17 November 2023
129	Saint Lucia	16 September 2024
130	Uzbekistan	10 July 2025
131	Trinidad and Tobago	29 April 2026
132	Andorra	22 September 2026
133	Gambia	23 October 2026

== Bilateral relations ==
Country	Formal Relations Began	Notes
Croatia	4 June 1999	See Croatia–Eritrea relations Both countries established diplomatic relations on 4 June 1999
Denmark	28 September 1993	Both countries established diplomatic relations on 28 September 1993 See Denmark–Eritrea relations
Ethiopia	22 May 1993	See Eritrea–Ethiopia relations Both countries established diplomatic relations on 22 May 1993 when first Ambassador of the Transitional Government of Ethiopia's to Eritrea Mr. Awalom Woldu Tuku presented his credentials to President Issaias Afwerki. Diplomatic relations were broken on 12 May 1998 when Ethiopia and Eritrea went to war over the disputed border area of Badme. Diplomatic relations were restored on 8 July 2018 In December 2000, Eritrea and Ethiopia signed a peace treaty ending their war and created a pair of binding judicial commissions, the Eritrea-Ethiopia Border Commission and the Eritrean-Ethiopian Claims Commission, to rule on their disputed border and related claims. In April 2002 The Commission released its decision (with a clarification in 2003). Disagreements following the war have resulted in stalemate punctuated by periods of elevated tension and renewed threats of war. Since these decisions Ethiopia has refused to permit the physical demarcation of the border while Eritrea insists the border must be demarcated as defined by the commission. Consequently, the Boundary Commission ruled boundary as virtually demarcated and effective. Eritrea maintains a military force on its border with Ethiopia roughly equal in size to Ethiopia's force, which has required a general mobilization of a significant portion of the population. Eritrea has viewed this border dispute as an existential threat to itself in particular and the African Union in general, because it deals with the supremacy of colonial boundaries in Africa. Since the border conflict Ethiopia no longer uses Eritrean ports for its trade. During the border conflict and since, Ethiopia has fostered militants against Eritrea (including ethnic separatists and religiously based organizations). Eritrea has retaliated by hosting militant groups against Ethiopia as well. The United Nations Security Council argues that Eritrea and Ethiopia have expanded their dispute to a second theater, Somalia. In March 2012, Ethiopian forces attacked Eritrean forces along the two countries' border. In July 2018, leaders both countries signed a peace treaty to put a formal end to a state of war between both nations paving the way for greater economic cooperation and improved ties between them.: Eritrea has an embassy in Addis Ababa.; Ethiopia has an embassy in Asmara.
Germany	3 August 1993	See Eritrea–Germany relations Both countries established diplomatic relations on 3 August 1993
Israel	24 May 1993	See Eritrea–Israel relations Both countries established diplomatic relations on 24 May 1993. Eritrea developed relations with Israel shortly after gaining its independence in 1993, despite protests among Arab countries. Israeli-Eritrean relations are close. The president of Eritrea has visited Israel for medical treatment. However, Eritrea condemned Israeli military action during the 2008–2009 Israel–Gaza conflict. Israeli-Eritrean ties are complicated by Israel's close ties to Ethiopia, who have shared an unfriendly dyad with Eritrea for a long time.
Italy	24 May 1993	See Eritrea–Italy relations Both countries established diplomatic relations on 24 May 1993: Eritrea has an embassy in Rome and a consulate in Milan.; Italy has an embassy in Asmara.
Mexico	23 June 1993	Both countries established diplomatic relations on 23 June 1993: Eritrea is accredited to Mexico from its embassy in Washington, D.C., United States.; Mexico is accredited to Eritrea from its embassy in Cairo, Egypt.
North Korea	1993	Despite Pyongyang's alignment with Ethiopia during the Eritrean War of Independence, Eritrea has maintained diplomatic relations with North Korea since the 1990s. Covert military ties also exist between Eritrea and North Korea.
Qatar	5 July 1993	During the 2017 Qatar diplomatic crisis, Eritrea refused a request by Saudi Arabia and United Arab Emirates to cut relations with Qatar, citing its "strong ties with the brother people of Qatar."
Russia	24 May 1993	See Eritrea–Russia relations: Both countries established diplomatic relations on 24 May 1993
Sudan	24 May 1993, diplomatic relations were broken from 5 December 1994 to 2 May 1999	Eritrea broke diplomatic relations with the Sudan in December 1994. This action was taken after a long period of increasing tension between the two countries due to a series of cross-border incidents involving the Eritrean Islamic Jihad (EIJ). Although the attacks did not pose a threat to the stability of the Government of Eritrea (the infiltrators have generally been killed or captured by government forces), the Eritreans believe the National Islamic Front (NIF) in Khartoum supported, trained, and armed the insurgents. After many months of negotiations with the Sudanese to try to end the incursions, the Government of Eritrea concluded that the NIF did not intend to change its policy and broke relations. Subsequently, the Government of Eritrea hosted a conference of Sudanese opposition leaders in June 1995 in an effort to help the opposition unite and to provide a credible alternative to the present government in Khartoum. Eritrea resumed diplomatic relations with Sudan on December 10, 2005. Since then, Sudan has accused Eritrea, along with Chad, of supporting rebels. The undemarcated border with Sudan previously posed a problem for Eritrean external relations. After a high-level delegation to the Sudan from the Eritrean Ministry of Foreign Affairs, ties are being normalized. While normalization of ties continues, Eritrea has been recognized as a broker for peace between the separate factions of the Sudanese civil war. "It is known that Eritrea played a role in bringing about the peace agreement [between the Southern Sudanese and Government]," while the Sudanese Government and Eastern Front rebels have requested Eritrea to mediate peace talks. The Eritrean President, Isaias Afewerki, and his Sudanese counterpart Omar Al-Bashir held talks in Asmara on a number of bilateral issues of mutual concern to the two East African countries. The talks dealt with enhancing bilateral ties and cooperation including making their shared border more open. Sudan and Eritrea agreed to abolish entry visa requirements, opening their common borders for free movement of both nationals. In 2011, Eritrea and Sudan cooperated in the building of the Kassala-Al Lafa Highway linking the two countries.
Turkey	19 July 1993	See also Eritrea–Turkey relations Both countries established diplomatic relations on 19 July 1993: The Embassy of Eritrea in Doha is accredited to Turkey.; Turkey has an embassy in Asmara.; Trade volume between the two countries was US$13.9 million in 2019.
United Arab Emirates	28 June 1993	The United Arab Emirates are a member of the Saudi-led coalition against Houthi rebels in Yemen. Foreign Minister Osman Saleh said that the UAE used the Assab port and airport. Human Rights Watch reported that the UAE maintains a detention facility at the Assab base, where it may have transferred high-profile prisoners out of Yemen.
United Kingdom	16 November 1993	See Foreign relations of the United Kingdom Eritrea established diplomatic relations with the United Kingdom on 16 November 1993.: Eritrea maintains an embassy in London.; The United Kingdom is accredited to Eritrea through its embassy in Asmara.; The UK administered Eritrea from 1941 to 1952, when Eritrea united with Ethiopia into a federation.
United States	11 June 1993	See Eritrea–United States relations Diplomatic relations between the United States and the State of Eritrea were established on June 11, 1993.: Eritrea has an embassy in Washington, D.C.; The United States has an embassy in Asmara.
Yemen	24 May 1993	A dispute with Yemen over the Hanish Islands in 1996 resulted in a brief war. As part of an agreement to cease hostilities, the nations agreed to refer the issue to the Permanent Court of Arbitration at the Hague. At the conclusion of the proceedings, both nations acquiesced to the 1998 decision which said sovereignty should be shared.

== See also ==
- Arab–Eritrean relations
- Eritrea–United States relations
- Denmark–Eritrea relations
- List of diplomatic missions in Eritrea
- List of diplomatic missions of Eritrea
