= List of diplomatic missions of Eritrea =

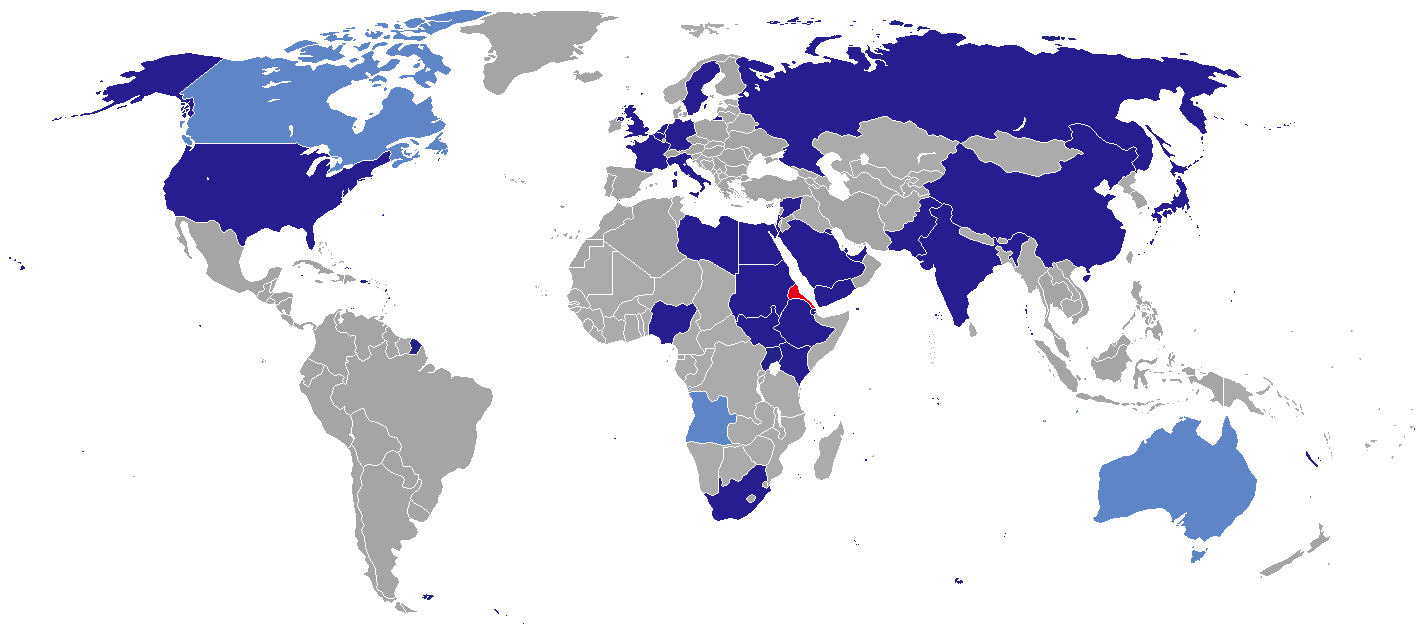
Diplomatic missions of Eritrea

This is a list of diplomatic missions of Eritrea. Eritrea is a comparatively young country that has tense relations with some of its neighbours, especially Ethiopia. Eritrea has relatively good relations with Djibouti and improving relations with Sudan and Yemen. It has a limited number of diplomatic missions around the world.

In 2007, the Eritrean government was ordered by the United States Department of State to shut down the consulate-general in Oakland, California which served a community of 7,000 in the San Francisco Bay Area; many Eritreans said that this would be a hardship to them. This action was in retaliation for restrictions imposed by the Eritrean government on the travel of US diplomats in Eritrea, interference with the diplomatic pouch and the inability to provide consular services to U.S. citizens in Eritrea.

== Current missions ==
=== Africa ===
- Angola
  - Luanda (Consulate-General) (Note: Subordinate to the embassy in Pretoria.)
- Djibouti
  - Djibouti City (Embassy)
- Egypt
  - Cairo (Embassy)
- Kenya
  - Nairobi (Embassy) (Note: Also accredited to Tanzania and United Nations Environment Programme.)
- Libya
  - Tripoli (Embassy)
- Nigeria
  - Abuja (Embassy)
- South Africa
  - Pretoria (Embassy) (Note: Also accredited to Angola, Eswatini, Lesotho, Madagascar, Malawi, Mauritius, Mozambique, Zambia, & Zimbabwe.)
- South Sudan
  - Juba (Embassy)
- Sudan
  - Khartoum (Embassy) (Note: Also accredited to Chad & Libya.)
- Uganda
  - Kampala (Embassy)

=== Americas ===
- Canada
  - Toronto (Consulate General)
- United States
  - Washington, D.C. (Embassy)

=== Asia ===
- China
  - Beijing (Embassy) (Note: Also accredited to Australia, Cambodia, New Zealand, & Philippines.)
- India
  - New Delhi (Embassy) (Note: Also accredited to Brunei, Indonesia, Maldives, Nepal, Singapore, Sri Lanka, & Thailand.)
- Israel
  - Tel Aviv (Embassy)
- Japan
  - Tokyo (Embassy)
- Kuwait
  - Kuwait City (Embassy)
- Pakistan
  - Islamabad (Embassy)
- Qatar
  - Doha (Embassy) (Note: Also accredited to Turkey.)
- Saudi Arabia
  - Riyadh (Embassy) (Note: Also accredited to Bahrain, Lebanon, & Oman.)
  - Jeddah (Consulate)
- Syria
  - Damascus (Embassy)
- United Arab Emirates
  - Abu Dhabi (Embassy)
  - Dubai (Consulate-General)
- Yemen
  - Sanaa (Embassy)

=== Europe ===
- Belgium
  - Brussels (Embassy) (Note: Also accredited to Luxembourg & European Union.)
- France
  - Paris (Embassy) (Note: Also accredited to Spain.)
- Germany
  - Berlin (Embassy) (Note: Also accredited to Austria, Czechia, Holy See, & Hungary.)
  - Frankfurt (Consulate-General)
- Italy
  - Rome (Embassy) (Note: Also accredited to Greece and Serbia.)
  - Milan (Consulate-General)
- Netherlands
  - The Hague (Embassy) (Note: Also accredited to Organisation for the Prohibition of Chemical Weapons.)
- Russia
  - Moscow (Embassy) (Note: Also accredited to Azerbaijan, Belarus, Bulgaria, & Romania.)
- Sweden
  - Stockholm (Embassy) (Note: Also accredited to Denmark, Finland, & Norway.)
- United Kingdom
  - London (Embassy) (Note: Also accredited to Ireland.)

=== Oceania ===
- Australia
  - Melbourne (Consulate-General) (Note: Subordinate to the embassy in Beijing.)

=== Multilateral organizations ===
- United Nations
  - New York City (Permanent Mission)
  - Geneva (Permanent Mission) (Note: Also accredited to Switzerland.)

== Gallery ==
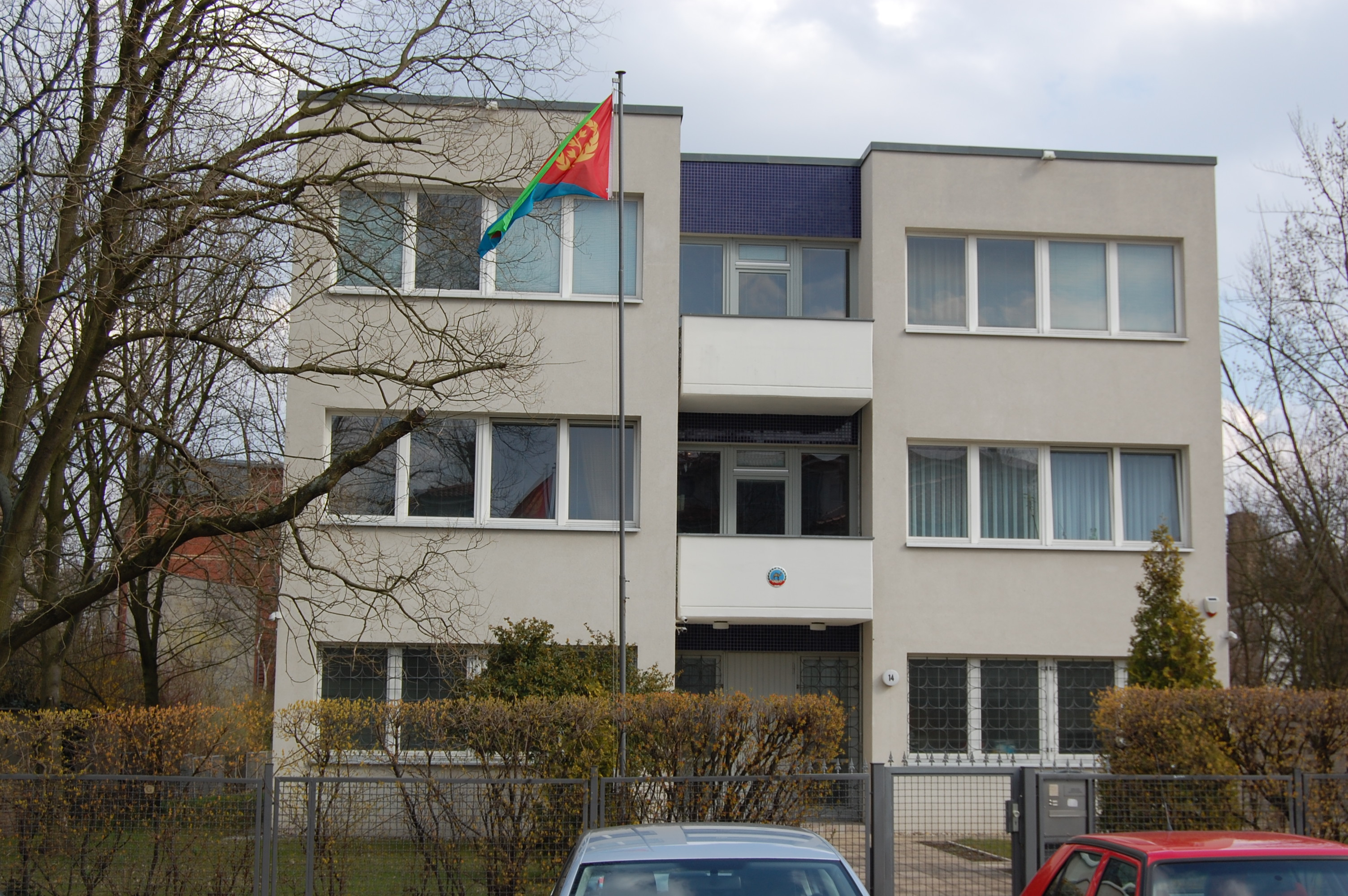
Embassy in Berlin

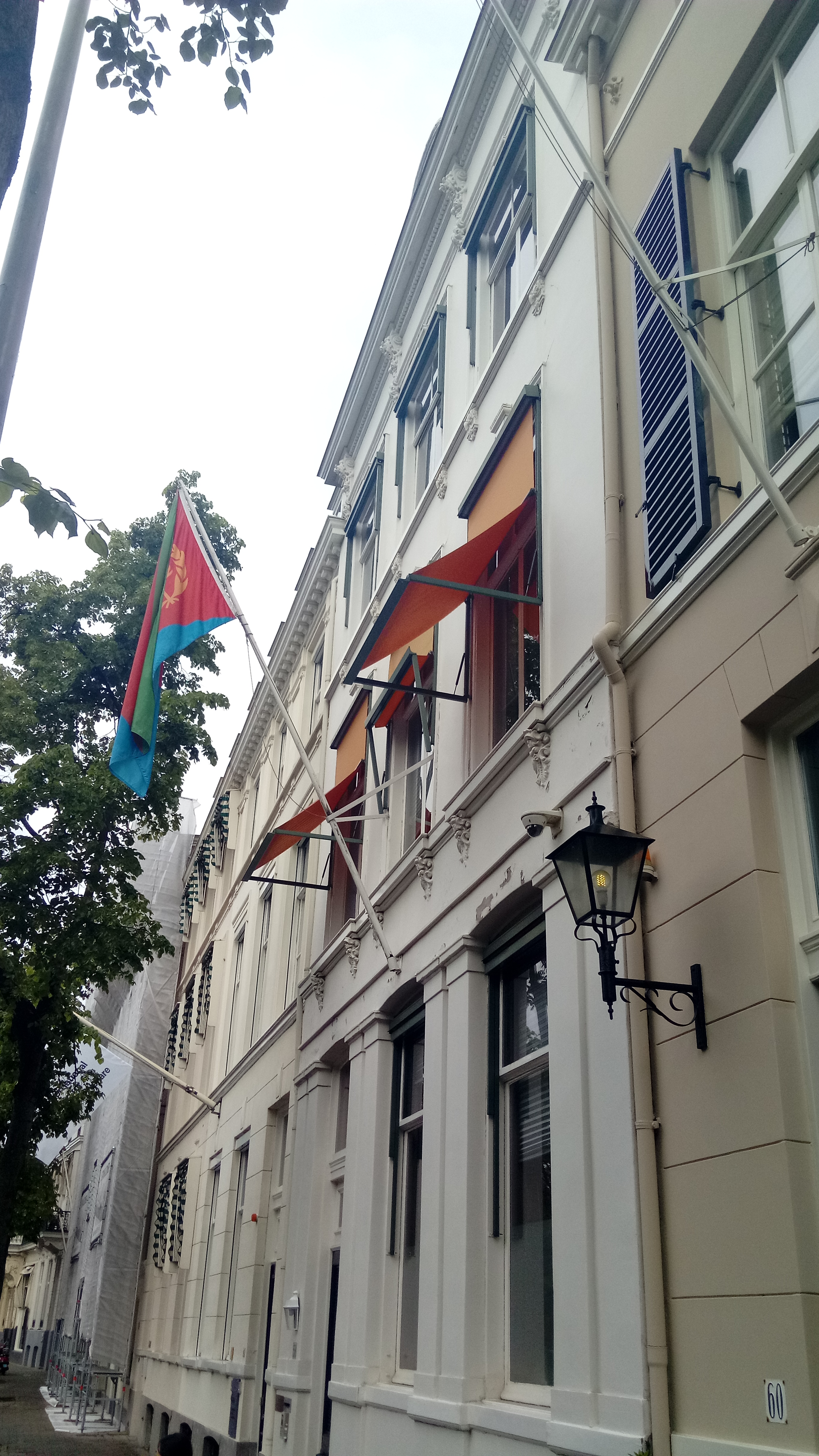
Embassy in The Hague

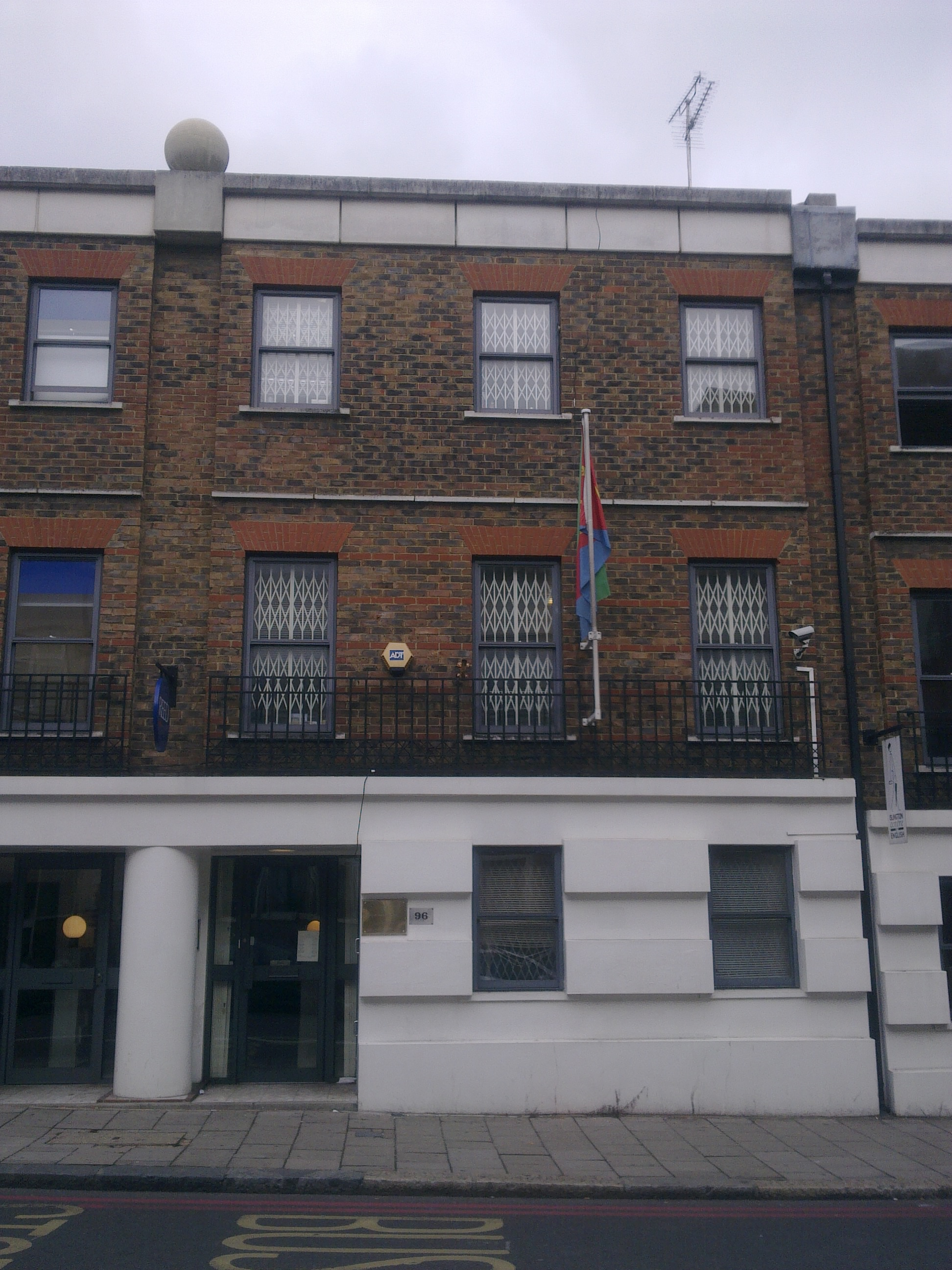
Embassy in London

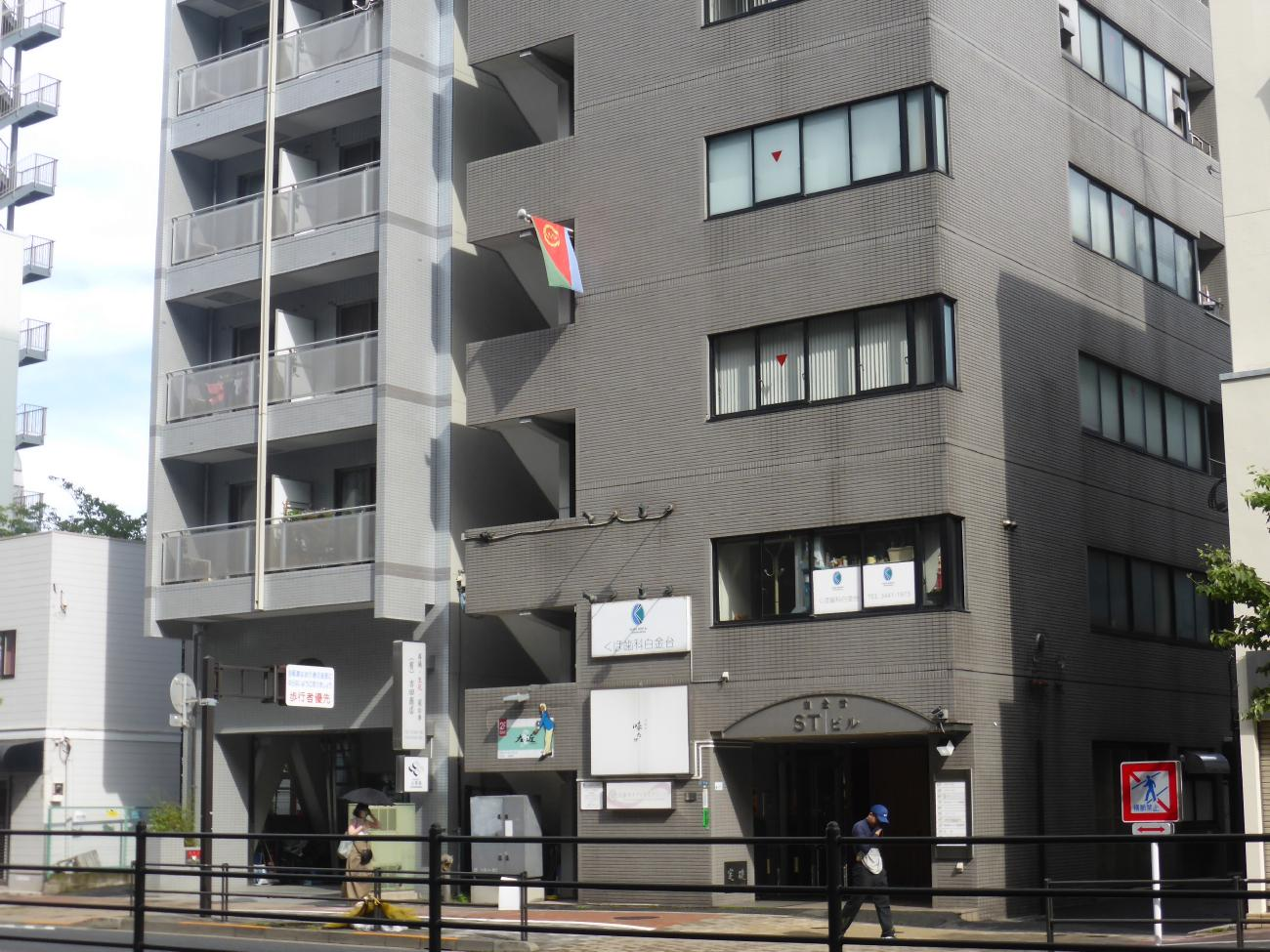
Building hosting the embassy in Tokyo

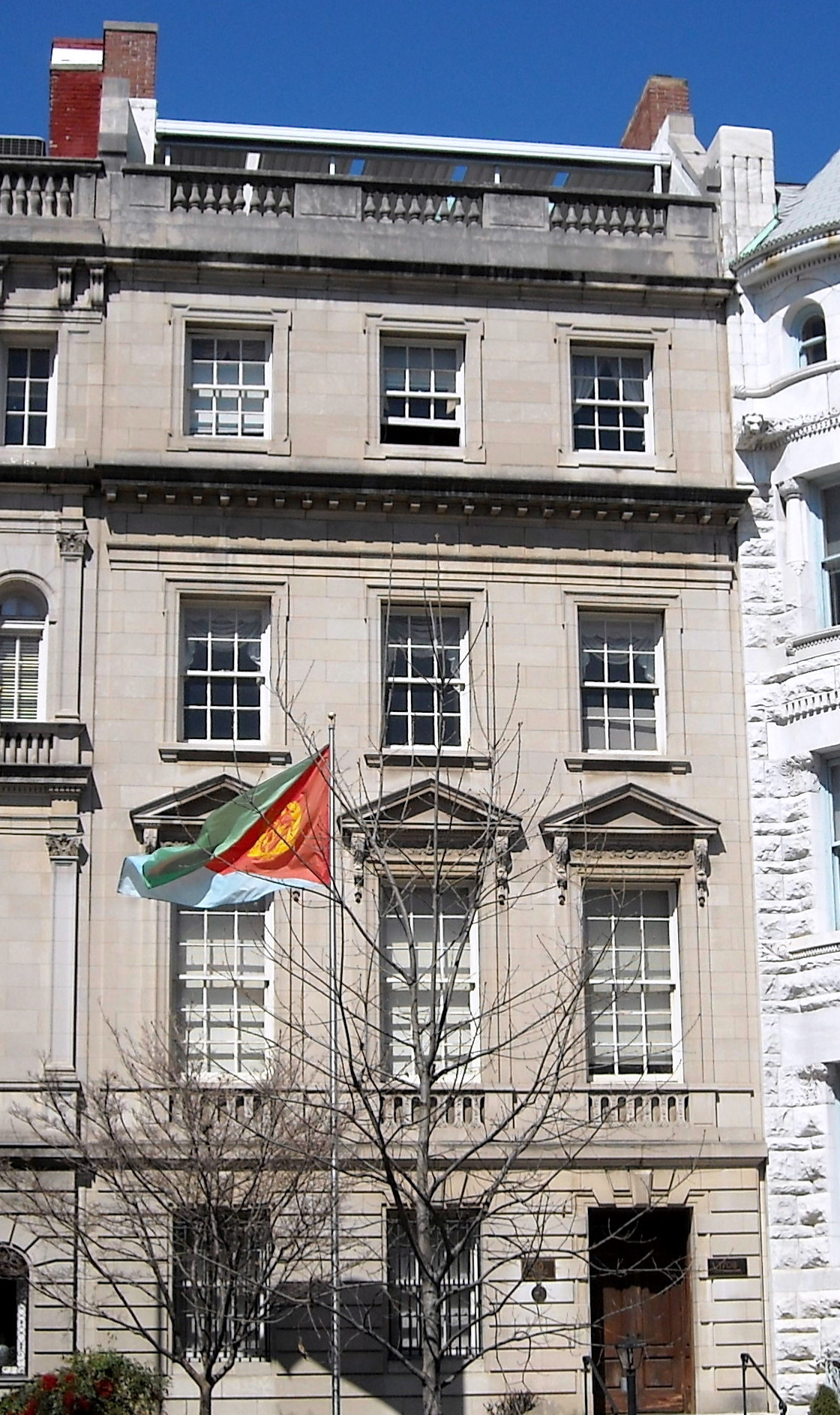
Embassy in Washington, D.C.

== Closed missions ==
=== Americas ===
| Host country | Host city | Mission | Year closed | Ref. |
|---|---|---|---|---|
| United States | Oakland | Consulate-General | 2007 | |

== See also ==
- Foreign relations of Eritrea
- List of diplomatic missions in Eritrea
- Visa policy of Eritrea
