= 2023 Eritrean clashes in Tel Aviv =

September 2023 protests between Eritreans in Israel

2023 Israeli Eritrean clashes
- Part of Eritrea–Israel relations
Date	2 September 2023
Location	Tel Aviv, Israel
Result	Suppressed

Belligerents
Eritrean opposition immigrants	Eritrean pro-government immigrants: Eritrean embassy in Israel	Government of Israel: Israel Police

Commanders and leaders
Unknown	Unknown	Benjamin Netanyahu

Casualties and losses
84 injured	Unknown	30 injured

On 2 September 2023, violent clashes took place in the streets of South Tel Aviv between Eritrean migrants opposing Isaias Afwerki's government, migrant supporters of Isaias Afwerki's government, and later with Israeli police who were trying to restore order. As a result of the clashes, more than 110 people were injured and 68 were arrested.

== Background ==
Isaias Afwerki has ruled Eritrea since independence in 1991. The country does not hold elections and lacks a parliament, independent courts, and civil organizations. The country has a one-party system; freedom of expression and press are severely restricted. There is also strict compulsory military service and a system of forced labor from which many Eritreans flee abroad. Afwerki’s decades-long rule has been described by international observers as highly authoritarian, and Eritrea is often ranked among the lowest in the world for freedom of speech, human rights, and economic development.

According to the Assaf refugee aid organization, there are currently about 25,500 Eritrean asylum seekers living in Israel. Eritreans who fled to Israel across the border with Egypt say they would face persecution if they were repatriated. The refugees have settled in a number of poor neighborhoods in the city of Tel Aviv, Israel's economic capital.

The clashes erupted during an event organized by the Eritrean embassy to mark Revolution Day on September 1, which commemorates the start of Eritrea's war of independence against Ethiopia in 1961. Anti-government protesters had earlier asked police to cancel a pro-government event organized by the Eritrean embassy in Israel. They also accused the Eritrean embassy of trying to spy on them.

The protests came amid the judicial reform protests against Benjamin Netanyahu.

== Clashes ==
On 2 September, clashes broke out after hundreds of opposition Eritrean immigrants approached the site of a pro-government event. Many of the anti-government demonstrators wore sky-blue shirts inspired by the 1952 Eritrean flag, a symbol of opposition to the country’s government, while government supporters wore purple shirts with a map of Eritrea.

According to Tel Aviv police commander Chaim Bublil, both groups had originally received permits for separate gatherings and had promised to stay apart. “At some point, the promises were broken,” Bublil said. “A decision was made by the government opponents to break through the barriers, to clash with the police, to throw stones, to hit police officers.” (Source PBS News)

Protesters broke through police barriers and smashed the windows of police and other vehicles, as well as the windows of nearby shops, Haaretz newspaper reported. They were also able to enter the grounds outside the Eritrean embassy and smashed chairs and tables.

Footage on social media showed Eritrean government supporters beating anti-government demonstrators with batons. Reuters journalists saw men with head wounds and bloody hands, some lying on the ground of a children's playground.

Al Jazeera correspondent Paul Brennan said that police did not expect the intensity of the violence that erupted. "The demonstrators managed to break through the barriers quite quickly. Police had to respond with tear gas and flash-bang grenades. There were running battles between the demonstrators and the police in riot equipment," he said. Residents said the streets of central Tel Aviv sounded like a war zone as police helicopters buzzed overhead and Israeli officers fired live rounds into the air.

Police said they had arrested 39 suspects who attacked police officers and pelted them with rocks. Some of them had guns, tear gas, and stun guns, officers said. Police also said they were reinforcing their personnel in the area as clashes between Eritreans among themselves and with police reportedly continued in south Tel Aviv.

By the evening, the clashes had stopped, but police were still making street checks and rounding up protesters, putting them on buses, for up to a total of 68 detained.

== Injuries ==
Israeli medical officials said more than 114 people were injured, including about 30 police officers.

== Reactions ==
Prime Minister of Israel Benjamin Netanyahu said he would convene a meeting on 3 September to discuss measures against those involved in the clashes, including deportations. A statement from his office called them ‘infiltrators’, the Israeli legal term for illegal border crossers.

On 3 September, Netanyahu said the Eritreans involved in the Tel Aviv clashes should be deported. "We want harsh measures against the rioters, including the immediate deportation of those who took part," the prime minister said in a special ministerial meeting called to deal with the aftermath of the violence. Netanyahu requested his ministers present him with plans "for the removal of all the other illegal infiltrators", and noted in his remarks that the Supreme Court struck down some measures meant to coerce people to leave.

An Israeli senior police officer said, "We were very surprised by the level of violence, with sights you see only in the West Bank."

== Aftermath ==
On September 18, an Israeli custody review tribunal ordered the release of at least 23 Eritrean nationals on the basis of lack of evidence.

== See also ==
- 2023 Israeli judicial reform protests
