= Zuqar Island =

Yemeni island in the Red Sea

Native name: Arabic: جزيرة زقر, romanized: jazīra zuqar
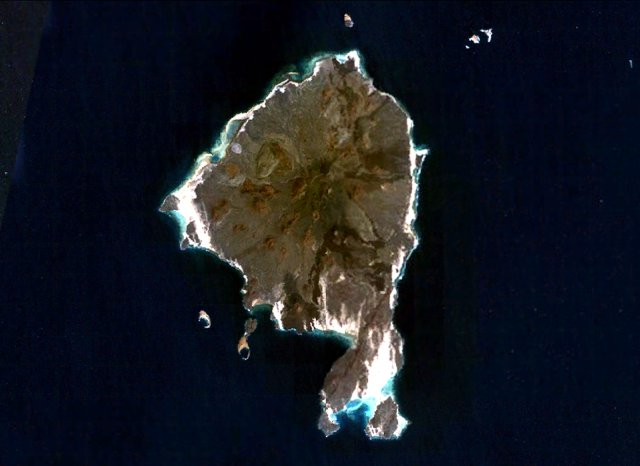
- A NASA Landsat image of the island
- Interactive map of Zuqar Island

Geography
- Location: Red Sea
- Coordinates: 14.024°N 42.765°E
- Archipelago: Hanish Islands
- Area: 130 km^{2} (50 sq mi)

Administration
- Yemen
- Governorate: Al-Hudaydah

Additional information
- Time zone: AST (UTC+03:00)

Zuqar Island (Arabic: جزيرة زقر, romanized: jazīra zuqar) is a Yemeni island located in the Red Sea. It lies between the coasts of mainland Yemen and Eritrea, near the Strait of Bab al-Mandab which connects the Red Sea to the Gulf of Aden. Despite its proximity to the African continent, the island is considered a part of Asia because it sits on the Asian continental shelf. It is approximately 130 square kilometres (50 sq mi).

The island is a shield volcano overlain by basaltic pyroclastic cones and spatter cones which produced youthful-looking pahoehoe lava flows. Several small coastal cones and islets surrounding Zuqar Island were formed by phreatic eruptions.

== History ==
Ownership of Zuqar Island was long disputed between Yemen and Eritrea as part of a dispute over the wider Hanish Islands archipelago the island belongs to. In 1995, this led to the Hanish Islands conflict. In 1996, the Permanent Court of Arbitration in The Hague began mediation of the dispute, and in 1998, awarded the larger islands, including Zuqar, to Yemen.

=== Yemeni civil war ===
Since the Yemeni civil war began in 2014, the island has been involved on multiple occasions. It was captured early and remained under Houthi control until December 2015, when it was retaken by a Saudi-led group utilizing airstrikes, causing fires on likely multiple rebel positions. The island's recapture was completed hours before a ceasefire between the two sides came into effect. The recapture was after the recapture of the smaller neighboring island al-Hanish al-Kabir, (a.k.a. Great Hanish), which had occurred in the week prior.

The situation remained this way until 2023, when Houthis began reestablishing their forces in the Red Sea and launching maritime patrols. In June 2023, fighting broke out on the island after Houthi naval forces landed and attacked the Yemeni National Resistance forces stationed there. They were likely repelled, as no land was reported to be lost.

In October 2025, a secretive 2,000 m (6,600 ft)-long airstrip was found to be under construction on the island via satellite imagery from Planet Labs, with the photos available suggesting it was near completion. The airstrip's construction was likely being funded by the UAE, who earlier in the year had funded the creation of runways on other strategic islands in Yemen.

Ships arriving to the island during construction were registered to Dubai-based firms, and sailing from UAE-friendly ports such as Berbera in Somaliland, though the UAE never claimed involvement. The Israeli television channel i24NEWS further claimed the military facilities also being constructed were being used to aid US and Israeli intelligence during and post-March–May 2025 United States attacks in Yemen, and in countering the Houthis as a whole.

On 19 July 2026, Yemeni National Resistance forces prevented a landing attempt by Houthi forces on both Zuqar and neighboring Hanish islands. The attack coincided with a ground attack launched by Houthis in the Al-Hudaydah Governorate. Upon being fired upon, the Houthi forces retreated north towards the Houthi-controlled town of Al-Fazah, Al-Hudaydah Governorate (south of Hodeidah).

On 10 September 2026, the islands were captured by the Houthis.

== See also ==
- List of islands of Yemen
