= Eritrean passport =

Passport issued to citizens of Eritrea

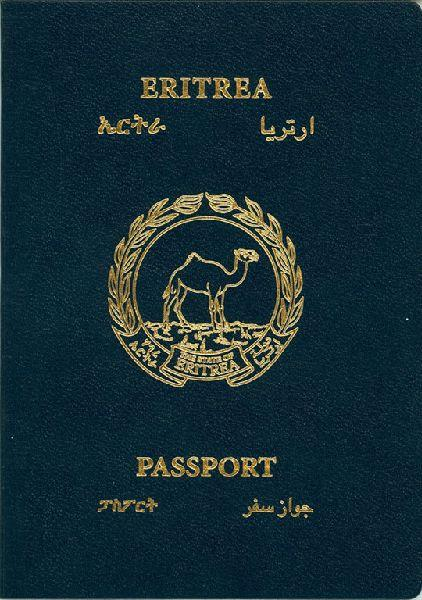
- The front cover of an Eritrean passport.
- Type: Passport
- Issued by: Eritrea
- Purpose: Identification
- Eligibility: Eritrean citizenship

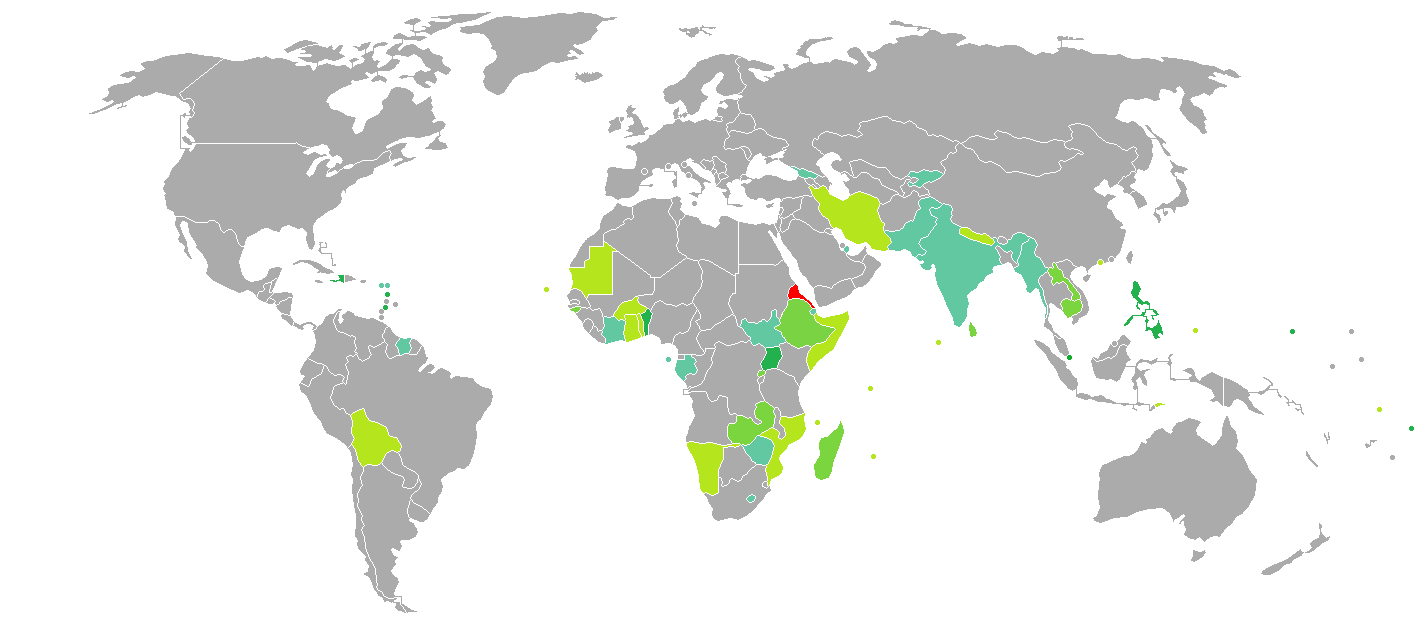
Countries offering visa-free or visa-on-arrival for Eritrean passport holders Eritrea Visa not required Visa obtainable on arrival eVisa Visa available both on arrival or online Pre-arrival visa required

The Eritrean passport is issued to citizens of Eritrea for international travel. Citizens are not issued passports prior to completion of military service. Eritreans living abroad only receive a passport from their consulate if they have paid their taxes to their country (Eritrea and the United States are the two only countries worldwide to use a citizenship-based taxation). The passport validity is 5 years or less. Eritreans wanting to take another citizenship require permission from the Eritrean Government if they do not want to lose Eritrean citizenship.

As of 15 December 2024, Eritrean citizens had visa-free or visa on arrival access to 42 countries and territories, ranking the Eritrean passport 98th in terms of travel freedom according to the Henley visa restrictions index.

== See also ==
- Visa requirements for Eritrean citizens
- List of passports
