= Eritrea–Italy relations =

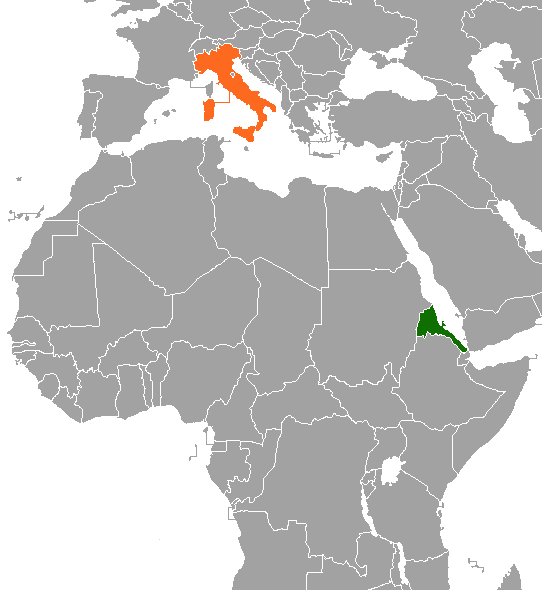

- Eritrea: Italy

Eritrea–Italy relations are the bilateral relations between Italy and Eritrea. Both nations are members of the United Nations.

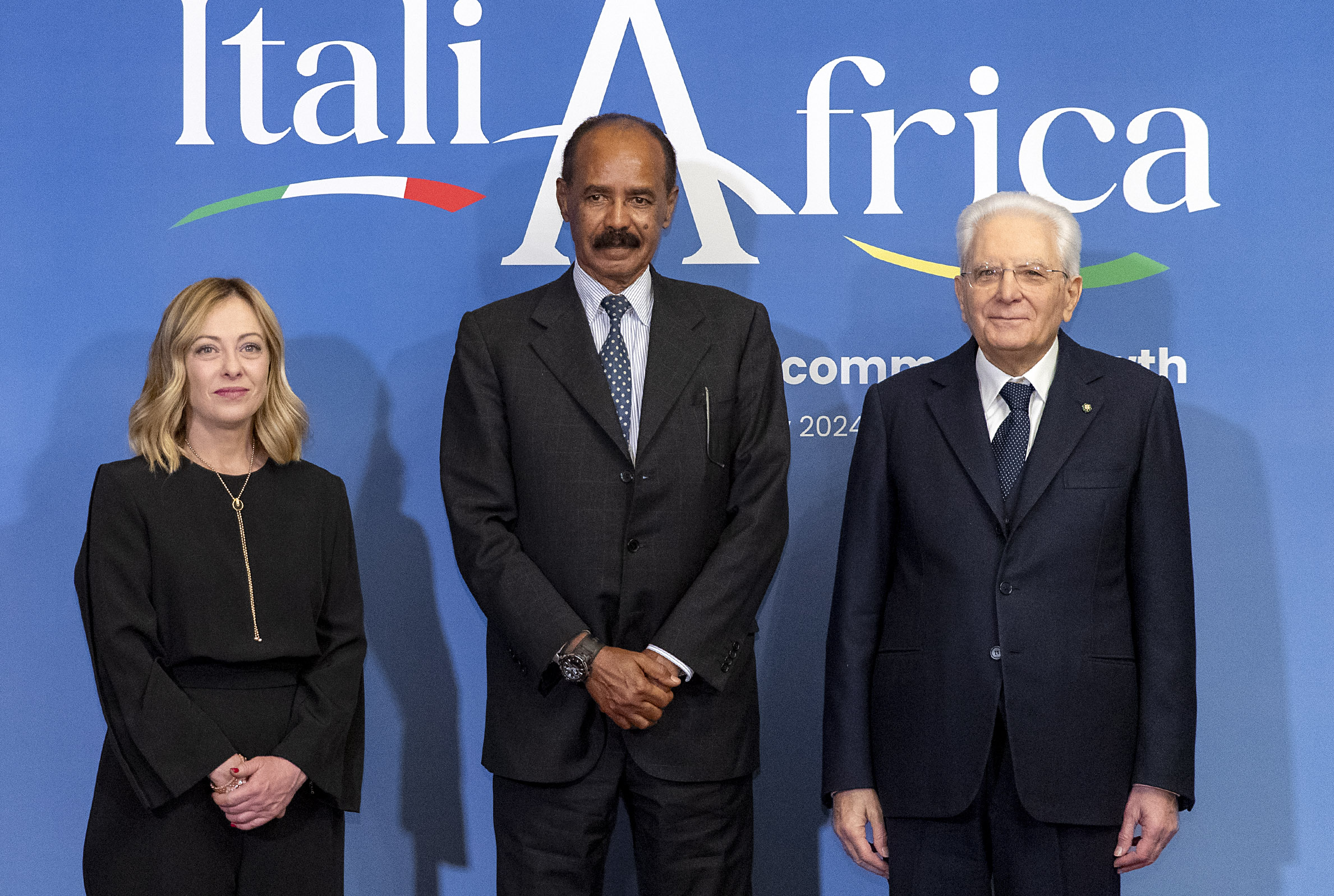
Italian Prime Minister Giorgia Meloni and President Sergio Mattarella with Eritrean President Isaias Afwerki at the 2024 Italy-Africa Summit in Rome

== History ==
Eritrea was an Italian colony from the 1880s until the defeat of the Italians by the Allies of World War II in 1941.The first Italian establishment in what is now known as Eritrea was in 1869 with the purchase of Assab by the Rubattino Shipping Company, which came under government control in 1882. In 1890 the colony of Eritrea (Italian: Colonia Eritrea) was officially founded. Mussolini's rise to power in Italy in 1922 brought major changes to the colonial government in Eritrea. After he declared the birth of the Italian Empire in May 1936, Italian Eritrea (enlarged with northern Ethiopia's regions) and Italian Somaliland were merged with the recently conquered Ethiopia in the new Italian East Africa (Africa Orientale Italiana) administrative territory. It remained so until Italy lost the region in 1941, during the East African campaign of World War II. Italian Eritrea then came under British military administration, and then in 1951 fell under United Nations supervision. Italy maintained some influence over Eritrean politics after 1948.

Asmara, the capital of Eritrea, used to be known as "Little Rome", was one of the most famous destinations for both native Eritreans and Italian colonialists. The city still retains a lot of Italian architecture.

When Eritrea gained independence from Ethiopia in 1991, Italy was one of the earliest nations in the world to recognise Eritrea as a country.

Eritreans are fleeing conscription and the country's political and economic isolation. Eritreans were the largest group of migrants and refugees entering Italy by sea in 2015, accounting for 25 per cent of arrivals in Italy, mainly coming via the Central Mediterranean route in boats departing from Libya. In 2016 there was a significant reduction.

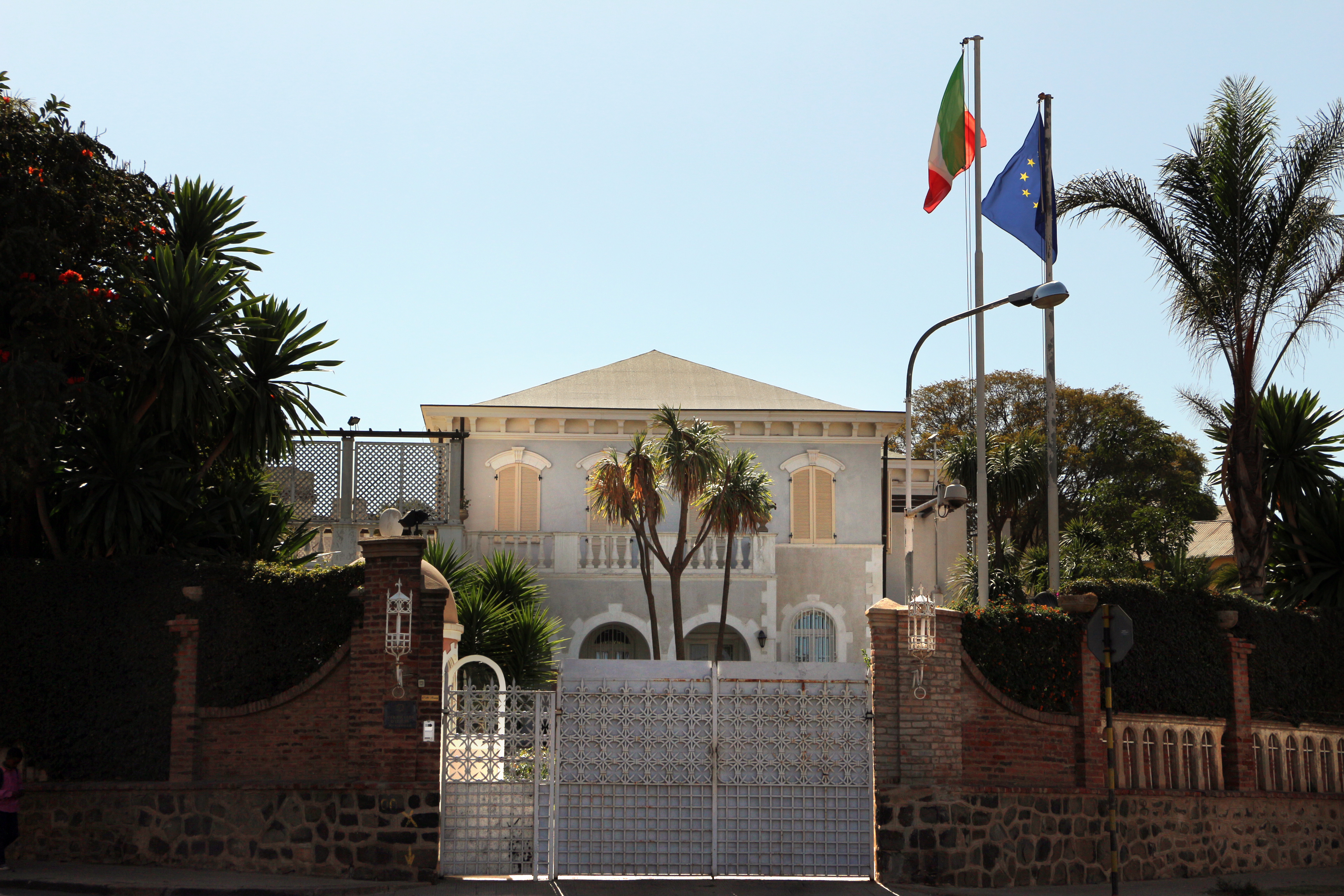
Embassy of Italy in Asmara

== Citizenship for Italian Eritreans ==
=== During the colonial period ===
The colonial government did not look favourably on unions between Italian men and Eritrean women.

"In 1940, the 'Norme relative ai meticci' (Law No. 822 of 13 May 1940) prohibited Italians from recognising children had by Africans and from contributing to their maintenance, and assigned to meticci the legal status of colonial subjects". These regulations found their ideological foundation in a form of biological racism, according to which mixing would cause a degeneration of the Italic race.

During the sixty years of colonialism in the Horn of Africa, it is estimated that at least 20 thousand meticci or moretti (a term perceived as derogatory) were born, and of these only five or six thousand were recognised.

=== After World War II ===
After the Second World War, laws changed. Eritrea became part of independent Ethiopia and in Rome it was established that those born in the territories of the former colonies were to be declared Italian citizens "if for any reason it can be justifiably believed that one of their parents is an Italian citizen".

=== From the period of independence to the present ===
The 1992 Italian law on jus sanguinis grants dual citizenship to those who can prove they have Italian ancestors, which is extremely difficult for those who cannot reconstruct their genealogical line. More than 300 descendants of people born under Italian rule were still in 2021 asking President Mattarella and the government to recognise the crime of colonial racism, which marked the lives of thousands of Italian-Eritreans, despised in their homeland precisely because they were not recognised by their fathers.

== Bilateral agreement for Italian schools ==
The Italian and Eritrean governments signed an agreement on 21 September 2012 to recognise Italian State Schools in Asmara.

On 25 May 2020, Eritrea unilaterally decided to withdraw from the Agreement, also revoking the licence to operate the Istituto Italiano Statale Omnicomprensivo di Asmara. The causes of the closure, according to the Eritrean government, are linked to the Italian government's decision to suspend the school's teaching activities due to the COVID-19 pandemic. A decision, according to the Eritrean authorities, taken arbitrarily, without prior consultation with local counterparts and leaving students and teachers in a situation of uncertainty. Furthermore, in June 2020, the Eritrean Ministry of Education banned students of Eritrean nationality who were supposed to sit for the State Examinations. This ban was later lifted.

A diplomatic action involving the Farnesina and Palazzo Chigi began in June in an attempt to mend relations between the two countries. On 26 June 2020, Deputy Minister of Foreign Affairs and International Cooperation Marina Sereni received Eritrean Ambassador Fessahazion for clarification on the resumption of activities. Prime Minister Giuseppe Conte wrote a letter to Eritrean President Isaias Afewerki, inviting him to a conciliatory dialogue. Despite Italian initiatives, the Eritrean government has not commented on the issue. On 31 August 2020, the institute was closed by the Italian ambassador in Asmara Michele Camerota, with a precautionary decree of temporary closure.

== Economic relations ==
Agriculture, fishing, construction, textile and also energy are sectors which present a significant value for trade between these two countries. There are two main categories of Italian stakeholders in Eritrea who influence the Eritrean economy, though they have less influence than in the past. Italian small and medium enterprises established their presence in the first half of the 20th century. The second group, which focus their investment in trading and the textile industry, is composed of new entrepreneurs. ZaEr of the StartAfrica group established in Bergamo has the largest volume of investment and manpower with 500 employees.

=== Economic relations between Italy and Eritrea during the colonial period ===
The Kingdom of Italy during the colonial period had numerous economic interests in Eritrea, then part of Italian East Africa. The interests were mainly in the use of the colony's natural resources, secondly in the development of the colony, especially in the Horn of Africa as a strategic point for trade and transit of vessels in the Red Sea.

The Kingdom of Italy adopted liberal policies to grow the Eritrean economy. Between 1902 and 1906, imports from Eritrea tripled.

Trade relationship between Italy and Eritrea during the period 1902–1907 (value in Italian lire).
| Year | Imports | Exports |
|---|---|---|
| 1902 | 1,805,445 | 2,373,205 |
| 1903 | 1,609,527 | 2,607,581 |
| 1904 | 4,618,560 | 3,942,183 |
| 1905 | 4,813,459 | 4,490,461 |
| 1906 | 5,931,797 | 9,022,486 |
| 1907 | 3,943,243 | 5,009,905 |

There were numerous products that the Kingdom of Italy imported during this period, the main ones being cotton and cement, but there was also tobacco. Also during these years large infrastructural investments were made in railway lines, such as those between Asmara and Massawa, and 3,600 km (2,200 mi) of roads were built.

=== The reasons for a stable trade relationship between Italy and Eritrea in the early 1990s ===
The trade between Italy and Eritrea was attractive because of the mutual interests in its consolidation. Italy would have been able to access Eritrean commodities such as salt and fish, bananas, mangoes, oranges and have access to and control of the sea, while Eritrea would have found a stable trading partner unlike its neighbouring states.

Import-export between Italy and Eritrea (1993–1997) (value in millions of Italian lire)
| | 1993 | 1994 | 1995 | 1996 | 1997 |
| Export | 23,509 | 46,140 | 76,749 | 129,508 | 101,664 |
| Import | 843 | 271 | 2,749 | 5,673 | 5,059 |
| Balance | 22,667 | 45,869 | 74,000 | 123,835 | 96.606 |

It can be seen from the table that imports of Eritrean goods were much lower than those of Italy and that the gap did not diminish over time.

== Italian architecture in Eritrea ==
Eritrea was an Italian colony from 1890 to 1941. During the colonial and fascist period, Italian architects built a lot of palaces, villas, theaters, churches, stations, cinemas, houses of which we still have testimony today. In particular, the capital Asmara welcomes an enormous artistic heritage dating back to the first half of the 20th century. For these reasons, Unesco has listed Asmara UNESCO World Heritage site in 2017 becoming the first Unesco site in the country of the Horn of Africa. During the Italian occupation especially in the fascist period, Italian architects redesigned the city experimenting with different architectural styles such as Futurism, Art Deco and Rationalism. Mussolini aimed to create an ideal city model which could symbolize the second Roman empire that the Dictator wanted to recreate. These are the reasons why Mussolini called the city the Africa's little Rome. The task of redesigning the city was entrusted to the architect Giuseppe Pettazzi. One of his best-known designs was the petrol station Fiat Tagliero, completed in 1938. This is an example of a futurist style building, indeed the idea of movement that characterizes Futurism is visible in the form of the construction: there is a central tower and two side wings that refer to the image of an airplane. Another example of futurist and Art Deco style is the World Bank Building, an Italian villa built in 1938.

== Resident diplomatic missions ==
- Eritrea has an embassy in Rome and a consulate in Milan.
- Italy has an embassy in Asmara.

== See also ==
- Foreign relations of Eritrea
- Foreign relations of Italy
- Italian Eritreans
