= Eritrea–Turkey relations =

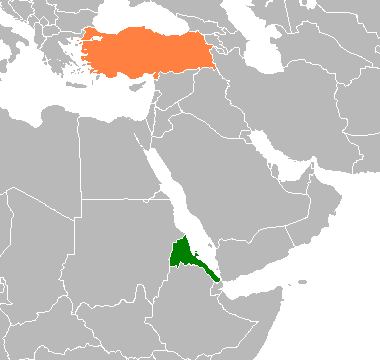

- Eritrea: Turkey

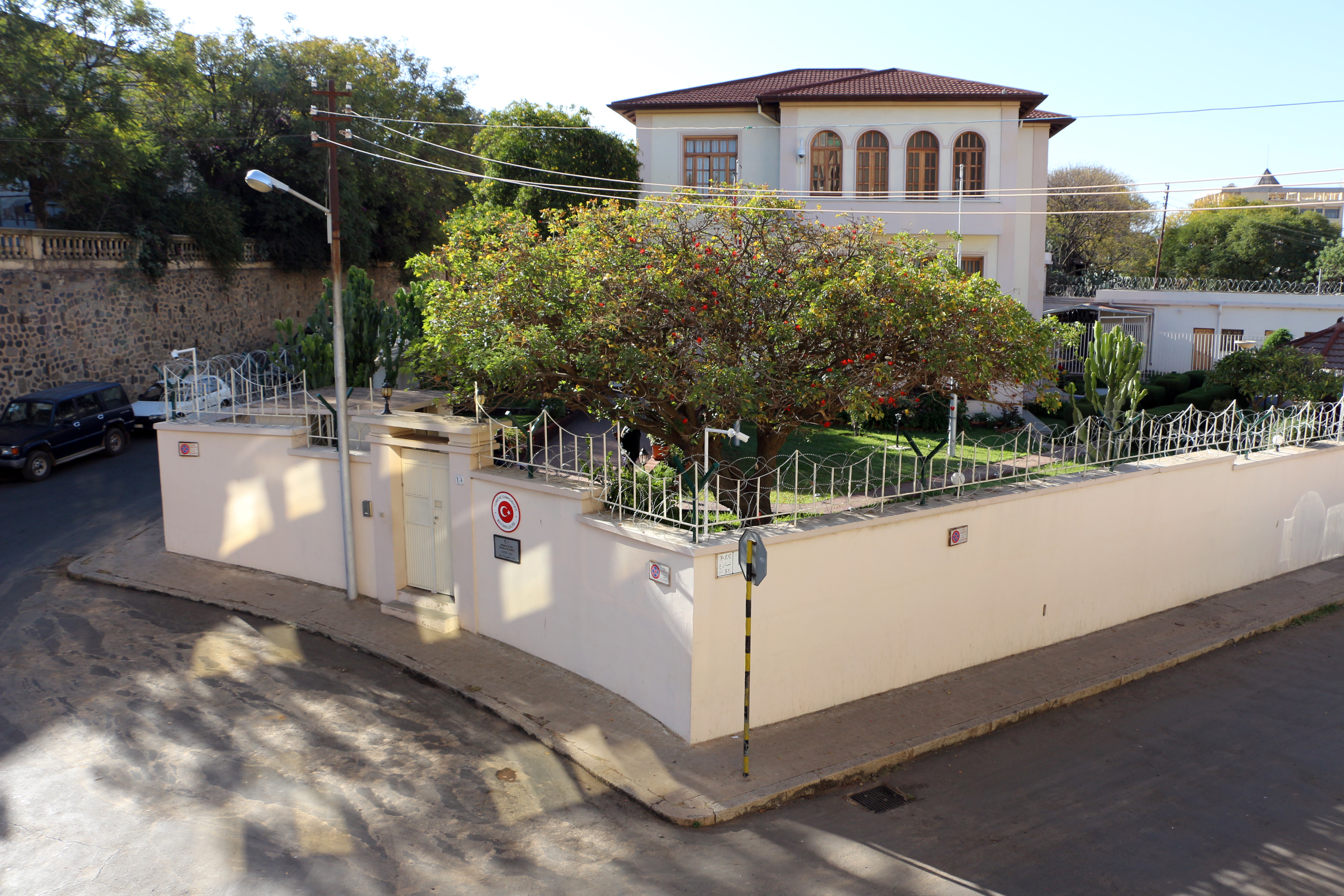
Turkish embassy in Asmara

Eritrea–Turkey relations are the bilateral relations between Eritrea and Turkey. Turkey has an embassy in Asmara since 2013, while Eritrea does not have an embassy in Turkey but the Turkish embassy in Doha, Qatar, is accredited to Eritrea. Turkey was one of the first countries to recognize Eritrea in 1993 and both countries established diplomatic relations in the same year.

Osman Saleh Mohammed, Minister of Foreign Affairs of Eritrea visited Turkey once in December 2011 and then the Turkish Minister of Foreign Affairs, Ahmet Davutoğlu visited Eritrea once in November 2012. In 2016, Turkey exported $15.600.000 worth of goods and imported $2.300.000 worth of goods.

Since August 2014, Turkish Airlines (THY) operates 3 flights between Istanbul and Asmara each week.

== See also ==
- Foreign relations of Eritrea
- Foreign relations of Turkey
