= Eritrea–Israel relations =

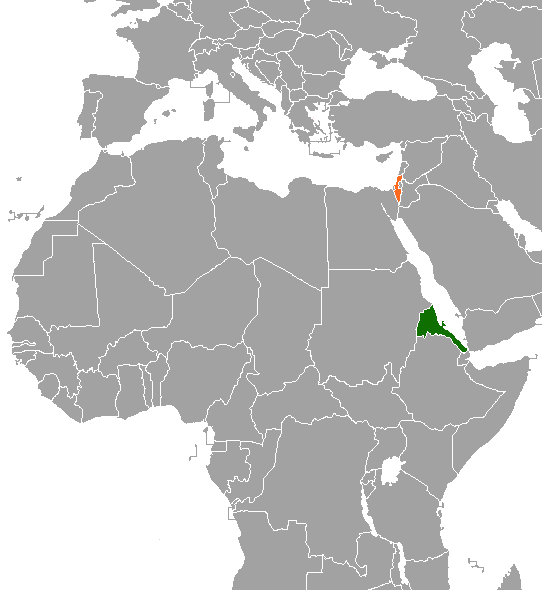

- Eritrea: Israel

Eritrea–Israel relations are foreign relations between Eritrea and Israel. Both countries established diplomatic relations in 1993 following Eritrean independence. Eritrea has an embassy in Ramat Gan and Israel had an embassy in Asmara, that was closed in 2022. Their ties were considered as very close, but after 2020 relations worsened. Both Eritrea and Israel have shared access to the Red Sea. Along with Cameroon, Eritrea is one of two African states that does not recognize the State of Palestine.

== Eritrean War of Independence ==
During the end of the Eritrean War of Independence, Israel provided support to Ethiopia. This was because it saw the Eritrean conflict as an extension of the wider Arab–Israeli conflict. The majority of Arab countries supported Eritrea's separation from Ethiopia. They saw its sizeable Muslim population (52%) as a way to make sure the Red Sea remained "Arab Waters". For this reason Israel allied itself with the Ethiopian government to take advantage of the long Eritrean coast which stretches over 1,080 kilometres. This began in the early 1960s when Israel started helping the Ethiopian government in its campaigns against the Eritrean Liberation Front (ELF). The Ethiopian government portrayed the Eritrean rebellion as an Arab threat to the African region, an argument that convinced the Israelis to side with the Ethiopian government in the conflict. Israel trained counter-insurgency forces in order to counter the armed struggle of the ELF.

Israel considered the Eritrean liberation struggle as supported by Arab states and feared that a pro-Arab independent Eritrea would block Israeli passage through the Red Sea. As the war developed, Israeli assistance to the Ethiopian government was increased. By 1966, there were around 100 Israeli military advisors in Ethiopia. By 1967, troops trained by Israeli advisors had taken control over much of Eritrea. By the late 1970s, the Eritrean People's Liberation Front (EPLF) had become the main rebel group in Eritrea after defeating the ELF. After another decade of war, in May 1991 the Ethiopian government was overthrown by TPLF, the EPLF rebel group (Eritrea) and other groups and replaced by a coalition government. EPLF rebel group established Eritrea's independence through a UN-backed referendum, making Ethiopia a landlocked country.

== Post-independence ==
A strategic relationship between the new government of Eritrea and Israel was formed when the President of Eritrea Isaias Afwerki travelled to Israel for medical treatment in 1993. Afwerki was transferred to Israel by an American airplane. The US representative in the Eritrean capital Asmara suggested the idea after the Eritrean leader fell ill. This happening along with American efforts led to the opening of an Israeli Embassy in Asmara on March 15, 1993, prior to the official announcement on April 27, 1993. There are allegations by Arab states of military and intelligence ties including claims that Israel aided Eritrea during the Hanish Islands conflict against Yemen (a country which does not recognize Israel), however there is no clear evidence.

Eritrea has an embassy in Tel Aviv, but does not currently have a permanent ambassador – a temporary appointee fills the role with a small staff at his side. The Israeli embassy in Asmara was closed in July 2022.

In September 2023, riots involving Eritrean migrants broke out in Tel Aviv between Afwerki's supporters and opponents. The riots were eventually broken up by Israeli police, following which Benjamin Netanyahu called for the Eritrean asylum seekers who participated in the clashes to be deported. Israel has a long-standing policy of protecting agents of the Eritrean regime. As of 2026, diplomatic relations are frozen, with the Eritrean MFA stating they did not have ties with Israel.

== See also ==
- History of the Jews in Eritrea
- 2023 Eritrean clashes in Tel Aviv
