= Visa policy of Eritrea =

Policy on permits required to enter Eritrea

Visitors to Eritrea must obtain a visa from one of the Eritrean diplomatic missions, unless they come from one of the visa exempt countries or countries eligible for visa on arrival.

== Visa policy map ==
Visa policy of Eritrea Eritrea Visa not required Visa on arrival Visa required

== Visa exemption ==
Citizens of Kenya and Uganda can visit Eritrea without a visa for an indefinite period of stay.

- Holders of diplomatic, official and service passports issued by China and Libya are visa exempt for a maximum period of 60 days.
- Holders of a passport for public affairs of China are visa exempt for a maximum period of 60 days.

Visa not required for minors under 18 years of age if accompanied by parents holding a national ID card issued by Eritrea.

== Visa on arrival ==
Citizens of the following countries may obtain a visa on arrival for Eritrea:

- Ethiopia (30 days)
- Sudan (Indefinite Stay)

Holders of a confirmation of a pre-arranged visa can obtain a visa on arrival, provided the sponsor in Eritrea submits a request to the Eritrean Immigration Authority 48 hours prior to arrival.

== Transit ==
Passengers with a confirmed onward ticket for a flight to a third country within 6 hours and cannot leave the airport. They must have documents required for the next destination.

== See also ==
- Visa requirements for Eritrean citizens
