= List of diplomatic missions in Eritrea =

This is a list of diplomatic missions in Eritrea. At present, the capital city of Asmara hosts 21 embassies.

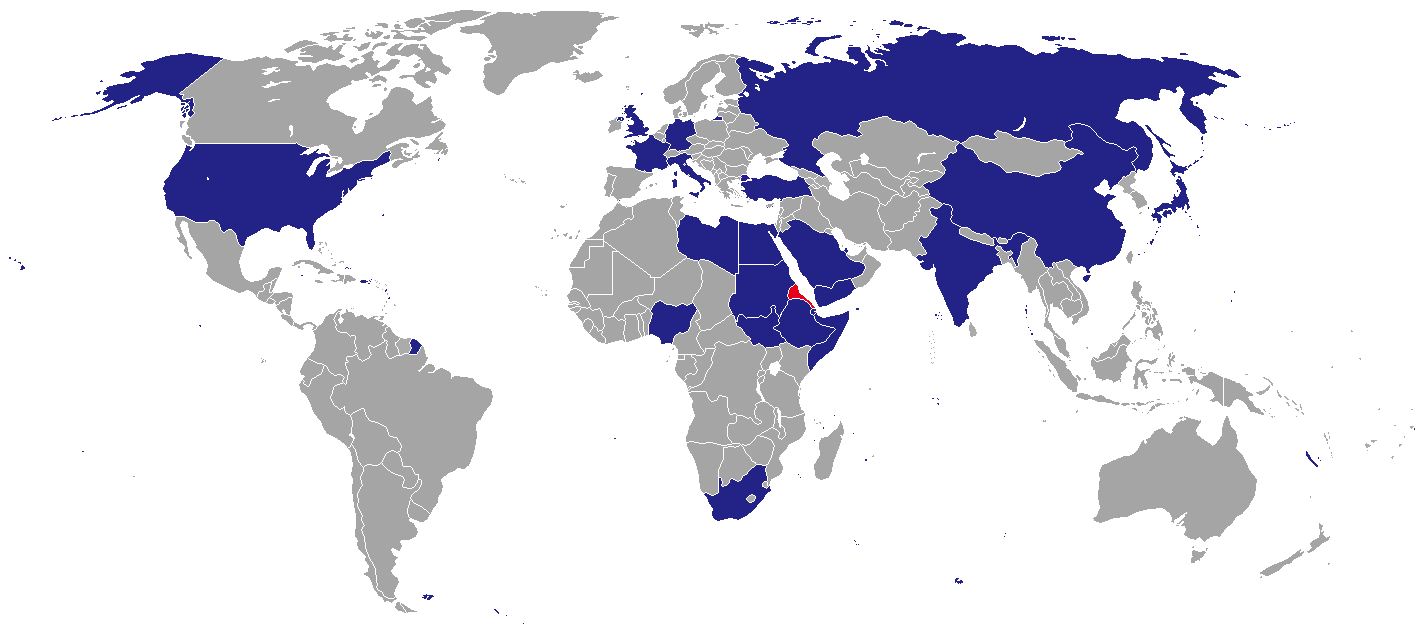
Map of diplomatic missions in Eritrea

== Embassies in Asmara ==
1. China
2. Djibouti
3. Egypt
4. France
5. Germany
6. India
7. Italy
8. Japan
9. Libya
10. Nigeria
11. Qatar
12. Russia
13. Saudi Arabia
14. Somalia
15. South Africa
16. South Sudan
17. Sudan
18. Turkey
19. United Kingdom
20. United States
21. Yemen

== Other posts in Asmara ==
1. European Union (Delegation)
2. United Nations (Resident Coordinator's Office)

== Gallery ==
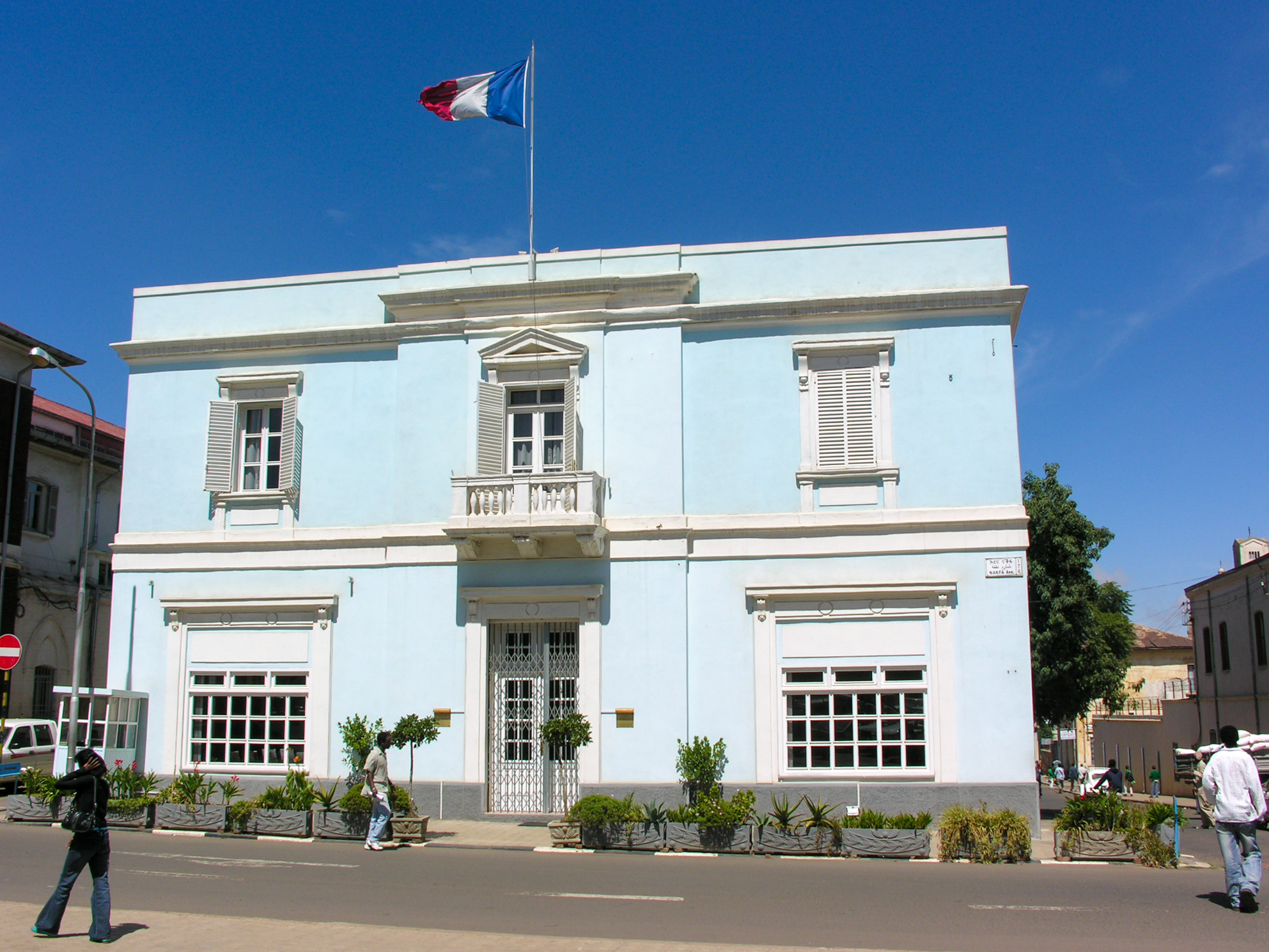
Embassy of France

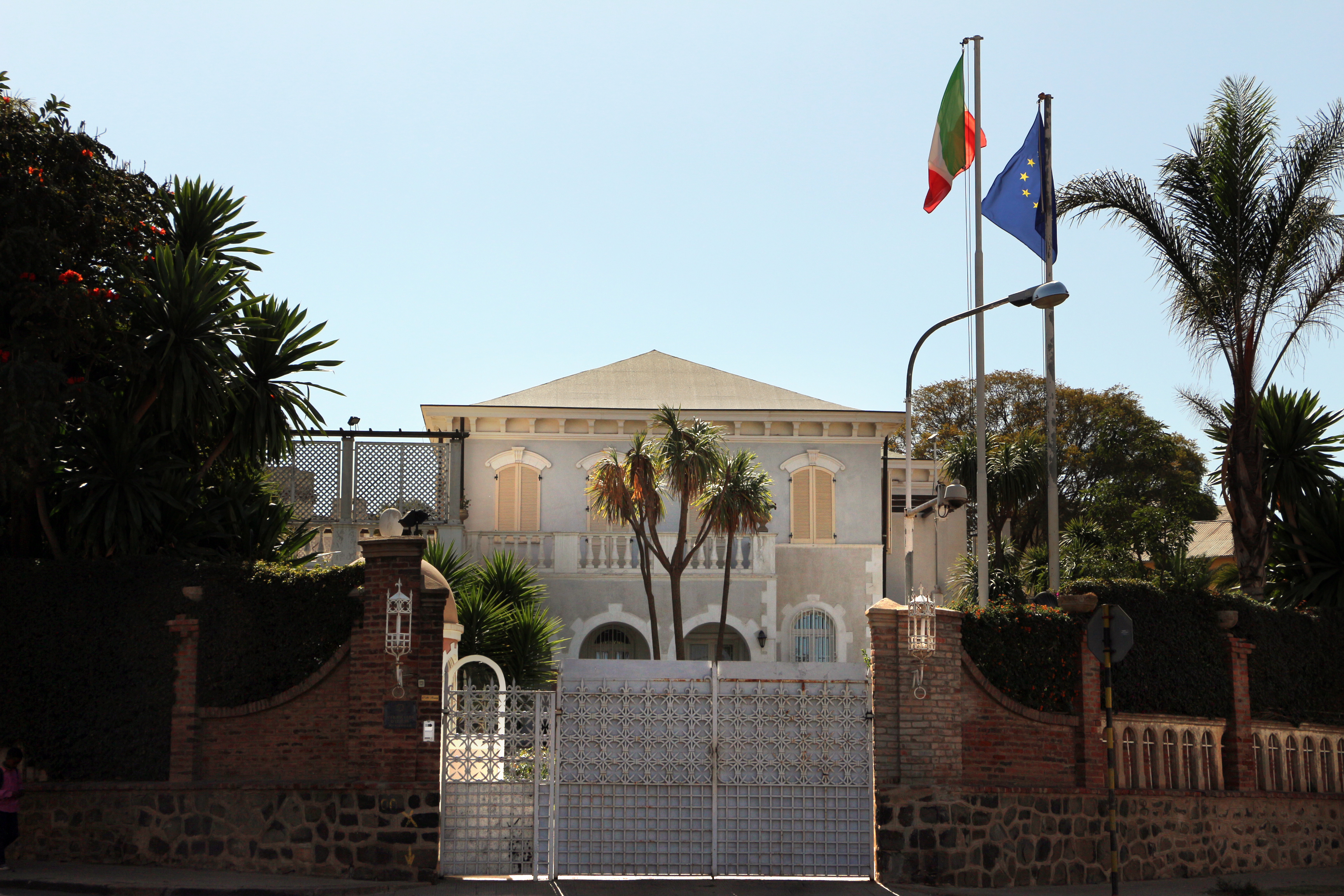
Embassy of Italy

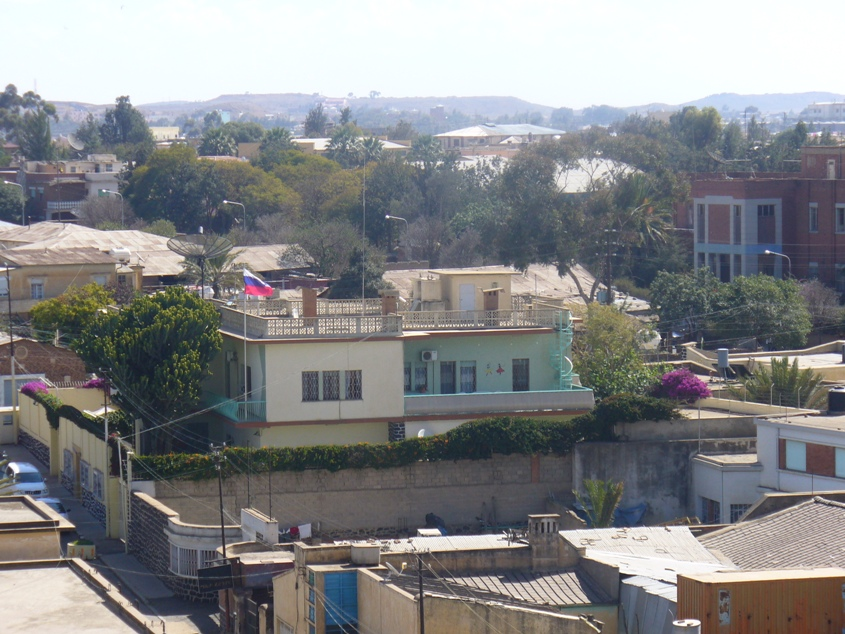
Embassy of Russia

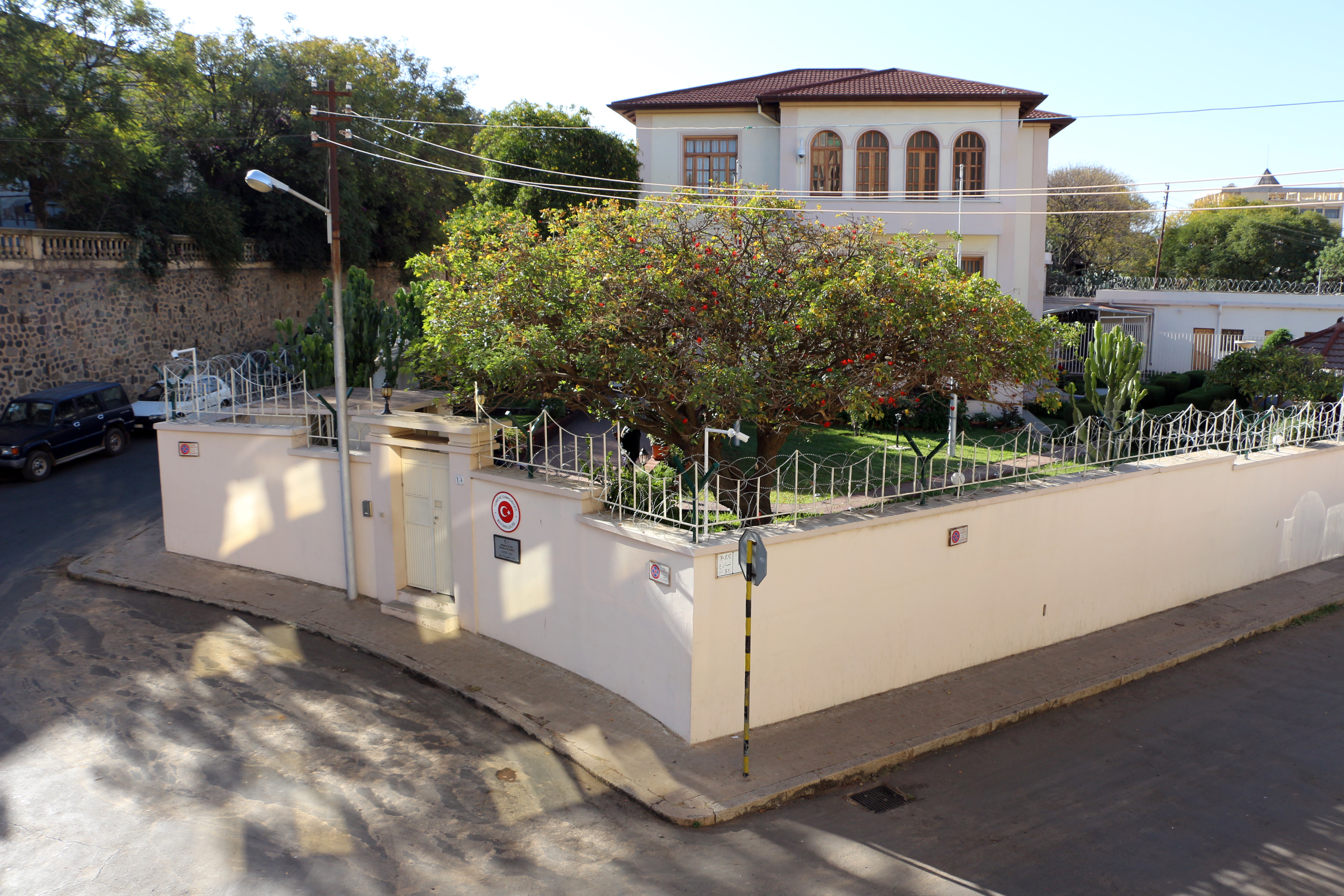
Embassy of Turkey

== Non-resident embassies ==
=== Resident in Addis Ababa, Ethiopia ===
1. Angola
2. Bulgaria
3. Burundi
4. Colombia
5. Equatorial Guinea
6. Ghana
7. Indonesia
8. Kazakhstan
9. Mali
10. Senegal
11. Seychelles

=== Resident in Cairo, Egypt ===
1. Armenia
2. Australia
3. Austria
4. Bangladesh
5. Brazil
6. Croatia
7. Czechia
8. Greece
9. Hungary
10. Ivory Coast
11. Kenya
12. Mauritania
13. Mexico
14. Nepal
15. Niger
16. Oman
17. Philippines
18. Poland
19. Portugal
20. Romania
21. Sri Lanka
22. Thailand
23. Ukraine
24. Venezuela
25. Vietnam

=== Resident in Khartoum, Sudan ===
1. Central African Republic
2. Holy See
3. Uganda
4. Zimbabwe

=== Resident in Nairobi, Kenya ===
1. Argentina
2. Belgium
3. Canada
4. Denmark
5. Finland
6. Iran
7. Ireland
8. Netherlands
9. Rwanda
10. Slovakia
11. Serbia
12. Switzerland
13. Tanzania
14. Zambia

=== Resident in other cities ===
1. Jamaica (Pretoria)
2. Pakistan (Djibouti City)
3. Paraguay (Rabat)
4. Sweden (Stockholm)

=== Unverified ===
1. Algeria (Riyadh)
2. Cuba (Sana'a)
3. Estonia (Cairo)
4. Guinea (Addis Ababa)
5. Guatemala (Cairo)
6. Grenada (Moscow)
7. Haiti (Rome)
8. Jordan (Riyadh)
9. Kuwait (Djibouti City)
10. Laos (New Delhi)
11. Maldives (Riyadh)
12. Malaysia (Muscat)
13. Malta (Valletta)
14. Morocco (Cairo)
15. North Korea (Cairo)
16. Norway (Khartoum)
17. Nicaragua (Cairo)
18. Sierra Leone (Addis Ababa)
19. South Korea (Khartoum)
20. Spain (Nairobi)
21. Turkmenistan (Riyadh)
22. Timor-Leste (Geneva)
23. United Arab Emirates (Khartoum)

== Closed missions ==
Host city	Sending country	Mission	Year closed	Ref.
Asmara	Ethiopia	Embassy	2026	
Asmara	Denmark	Embassy	2003	
Asmara	Israel	Embassy	2022	
Asmara	Kuwait	Embassy	Unknown	
Asmara	Netherlands	Embassy	2011	
Asmara	Norway	Embassy	2013	
Asmara	Pakistan	Embassy	2020	
Asmara	South Korea	Embassy	2007	
Assab	Ethiopia	Consulate	Unknown	

== See also ==
- Foreign relations of Eritrea
- List of diplomatic missions of Eritrea
