= Arab League–Eritrean relations =

Bilateral relations

- Arab League: Eritrea

Eritrea is one of the three non-member states of the Arab League which adopted Arabic as a working language. Eritrea chooses not to be a part of the Arab League.

== Observer status ==
In 1993, after independence, Eritrea adopted a policy of getting in touch with the Arab states, a move that several intellects in the country were divided upon, some preferring to join the Arab League as an Observer, others calling for joining as a Member, while others called for not getting in touch with the country's mostly Arab perimeter, with Sudan on its northwestern borders, Djibouti on the southeastern borders, and the Arabian Peninsula across the Bab el Mandeb.

In 2003, Eritrea finally agreed on joining as an Observer, a country adopting Arabic language as a second Language, after a Presidential announcement that Eritrea will not be joining any regional organisation.

== Economic sanctions ==
In 2010, the Eritrean president Isaias Afewerki, sent a letter to the Arab League Secretary-General Amr Moussa, calling for the Arab League's pressure on removing the latest UN sanctions over the country. The sanctions were enforced after his country was accused of supporting insurgents in Somalia, and were enacted in the UNSC by 13 of the 15 members.

== Tensions ==
Eritrea has been in two conflicts with Arab League members: Yemen in a dispute over the Hanish Islands in 1996 resulted in a brief conflict, and clashes with Djibouti in 2008, over the Ras Doumeira region, where the Arab League held an emergency session in response to the fighting and called for Eritrea to withdraw from the border region.
