= Denmark–Eritrea relations =

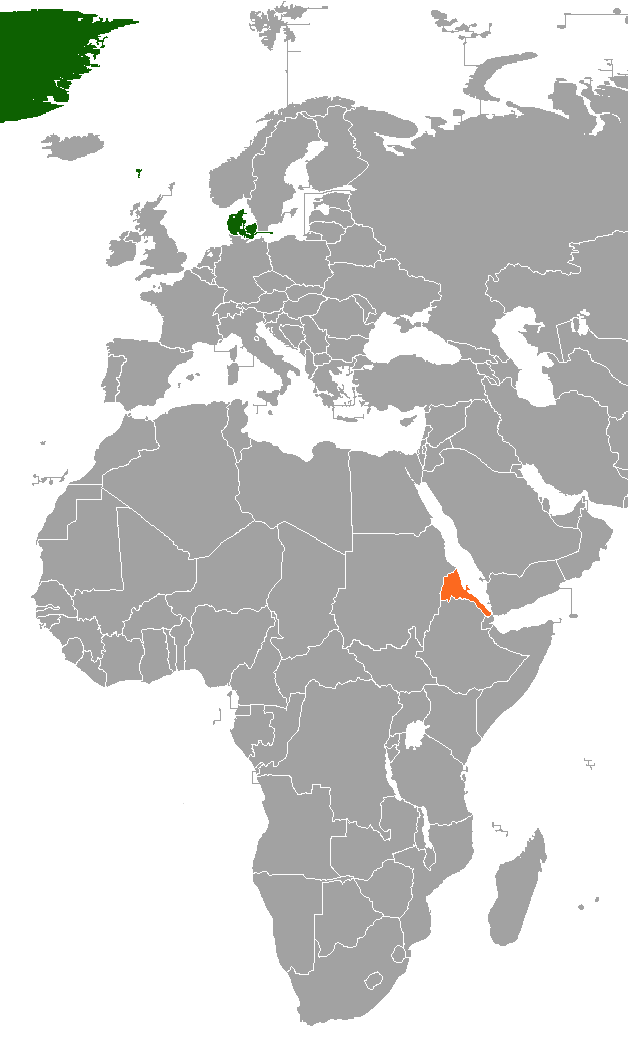

- Denmark: Eritrea

Denmark–Eritrea relations refers to the current and historical relations between Denmark and Eritrea. Denmark is represented in Eritrea through its embassy in Nairobi, Kenya, and Eritrea is represented in Denmark through its embassy in Stockholm, Sweden.

Diplomatic relations were established in 1993 and suffered a setback after Denmark decided to suspend development cooperation with Eritrea in January 2002 and close its embassy in June 2002. After the Eritrean–Ethiopian War from 1998 to 2000, Denmark sent 320 soldiers to the United Nations Mission in Ethiopia and Eritrea to monitor a ceasefire in the border war.

== History ==
In 1950, Denmark and 15 other countries voted for a united Eritrea and Ethiopia under Haile Selassie in the United Nations. During the Eritrean War of Independence, Denmark sent humanitarian assistance to the Eritrean People's Liberation Front. In the 1980s, the parliament of Denmark passed a resolution supporting the independence in Eritrea. Denmark opened an embassy in Asmara in July 1997, but closed it in June 2002, because of the lack of democracy in the country. In October 2001, Eritrea expelled the Italian ambassador, and later Denmark recalled its ambassador to Eritrea for consultations. In 2001, Denmark ended aid to Eritrea because of the arrest of Eritrean students and opposition politicians by President Isaias Afewerki, and the lack of freedom of the press in Eritrea. Another reason was the new liberal government of Denmark, that decided to reduce the aid budget.

== Development assistance ==
Eritrea was chosen as a Danish programme country from 1993 to 1996, and again from 1999 to 2001. Denmark has been supporting Eritrea with counteracting land degradation. In 1996, Denmark contributed $35,000 through United Nations Convention to Combat Desertification and in 1997, $111,000 through United Nations Truce Supervision Organization to Eritrea. In 1996, Denmark assisted 112 million DKK to the agriculture sector, and 80 million DKK to the education sector. The total aid to the Eritrean agricultural programme amounted 112 million DKK. (US$15 million) From 2001 to 2004, Denmark assisted Eritrea 36.60 million DKK for the justice sector. In 2001, both countries agreed to develop the legal sector. In 2001, Denmark donated $2.199 million to support the clearance of landmines in Eritrea.

== High level visits ==
In the 2000 Arab League summit in Cairo, President Afewerki met Prince Frederik and called the relationship between Denmark and Eritrea "exemplary". In February 2001, Danish Foreign Minister Mogens Lykketoft visited Eritrea, to discuss development programmes between Denmark and Eritrea.

== See also ==
- Foreign relations of Denmark
- Foreign relations of Eritrea
