= Eritrea–Russia relations =

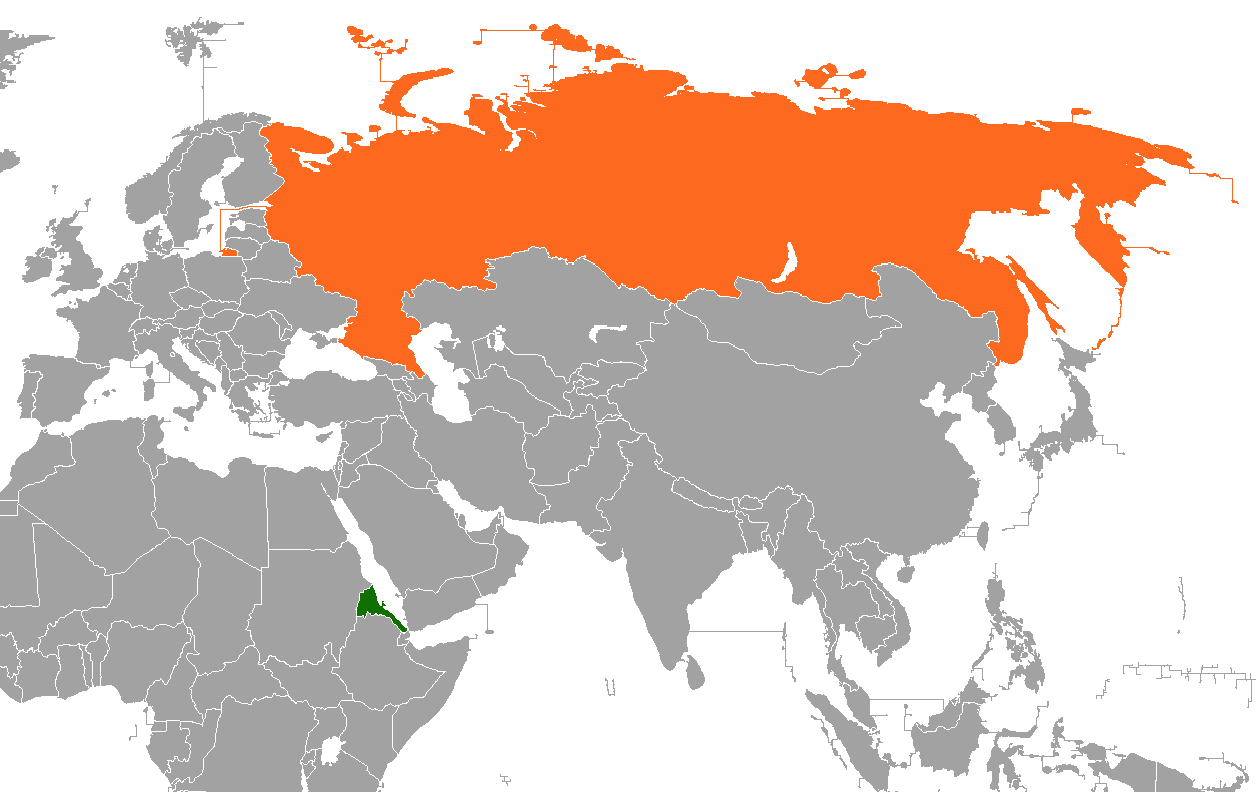

- Eritrea: Russia

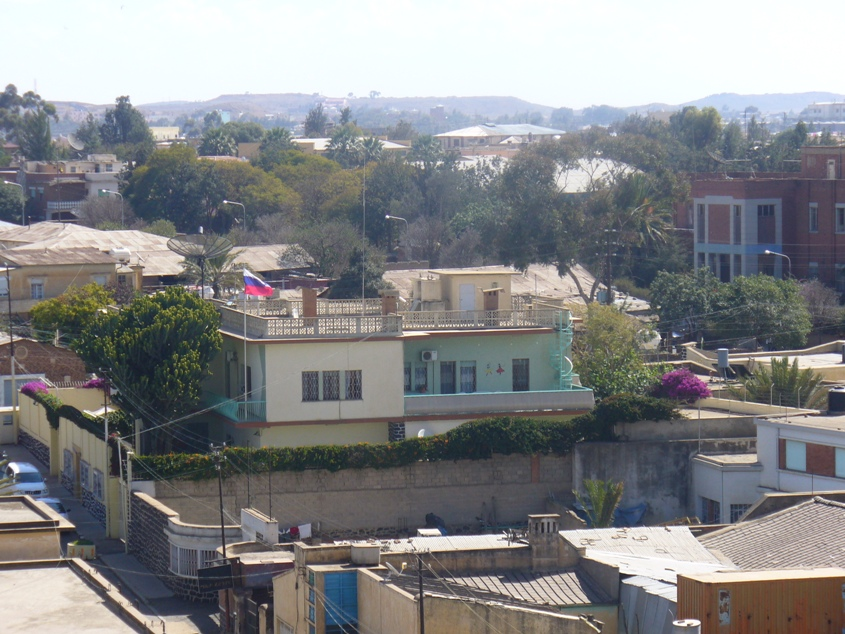
Russian embassy in Asmara

Eritrea and Russia relations are diplomatic relations between the State of Eritrea and the Russian Federation. Russia has an embassy in Asmara and Eritrea has its own in Moscow. Eritrean president Isaias Afwerki has been a supporter of Russia in the Russo-Ukrainian war since 2022.

== History ==
Diplomatic relations between the two countries were established on May 24, 1993. In July 2000 and February 2003, humanitarian aid was delivered to Eritrea by aircraft of the Russian Emergencies Ministry.

The Russian Embassy in Asmara has been operating since June 1994, the Eritrean Embassy in Moscow opened two years later in June 1996.

In 2010, President Isaias received Russian special envoy Mikhail Margelov for a meeting, where he criticized U.S. policies in the region and the "uni-polar balance of force". In 2018, Russia and Eritrea announced their intentions to build a logistics center in an unnamed Eritrean port city.

=== Russian invasion of Ukraine and intensification of relations ===
Along with Belarus, and North Korea, Eritrea was one of only four countries not including Russia to vote against a United Nations General Assembly resolution condemning Russia's 2022 invasion of Ukraine. However, Eritrea abstained from voting on the UN resolution pertaining to the territorial integrity of Ukraine, which was held in response to the 2022 annexation referendums in Russian-occupied Ukraine. In 2023, Eritrea's President Isaias Afwerki voiced support for Russia in the Russo-Ukrainian war.

In January 2023, the Russia foreign minister Sergey Lavrov and senior advisors traveled to Eritrea meeting with President Afwerki, the Eritrean foreign minister and other senior officials. Afwerki visited Russia on an official state visit in spring of 2023, the first in the history of Russia-Eritrea relations. Both Eritrean and Russian leaders held talks. Afwerki returned to Russia later that summer, attending the 2023 Russia–Africa Summit in Saint Petersburg.

In March 2024, the Russian Navy sent the Pacific Fleet vessels Varyag and Marshal Shaposhnikov to the Red Sea. On 29 March, the Eritrean Ministry of Information released photos of the Marshal Shaposhnikov at the port of Massawa and revealed that the vessels were sent to mark the 30th anniversary of diplomatic ties between the two countries and will leave on 5 April. The decision to send the vessels to the Red Sea sparked speculation from Western media since it occurred during the Red Sea crisis.

== See also ==
- List of ambassadors of Russia to Eritrea
