= Hanish Islands =

Red Sea archipelago

Arabic: جزر حنيش Tigrinya: ደሴታት ሓኒሽ
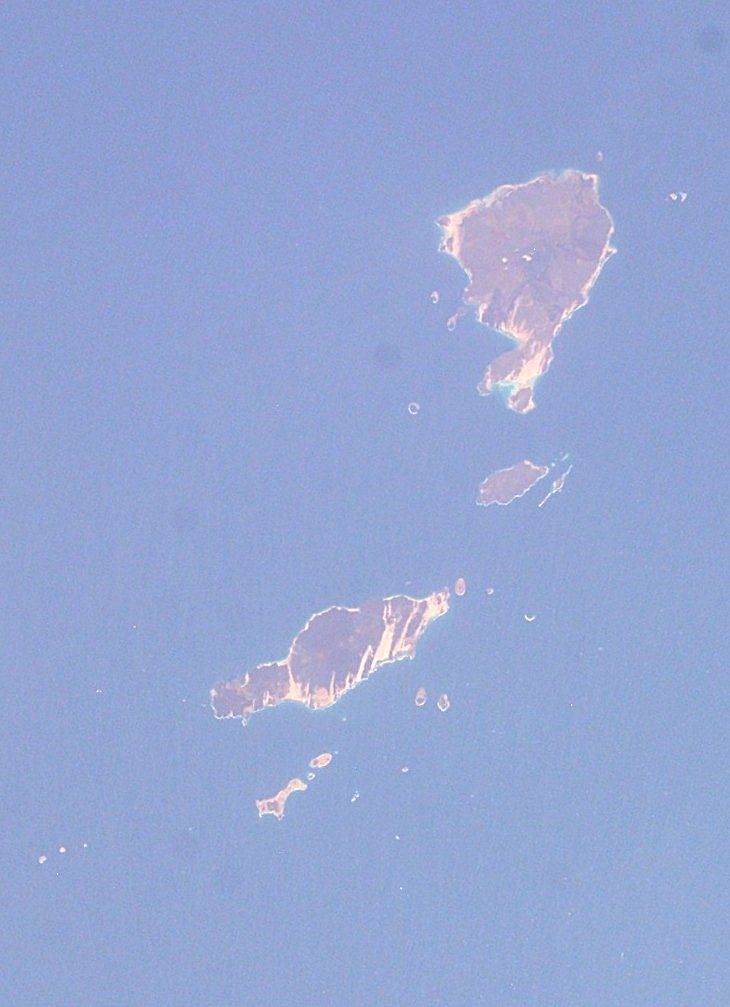
- The archipelago seen from the ISS
- Interactive map of Hanish Islands

Geography
- Location: Red Sea
- Coordinates: 13°45′N 42°45′E
- Adjacent to: Bab-el-Mandeb
- Major islands: Zuqar Island; Little Hanish; Great Hanish; Suyūl Hanish
- Highest elevation: 2,047 ft (623.9 m)
- Highest point: Jabal Zuqar, Zuqar Island

Administration
- Yemen (Houthis)
- Governorate: Al Hudaydah

Additional information
- Time zone: Arabia Standard Time

The Hanish Islands (Arabic: جزر حنيش, romanized: juzur ḥanīš, Tigrinya: ደሴታት ሓኒሽ, romanized: däsetat ḥaniš) form an archipelago in the Red Sea consisting of a trio of major islands at the centre of an array of smaller islets and rocks. The three major islands are the northern Zuqar Island, the southern Great Anish (Al-anīsh al-Kabīr), and the significantly smaller Little Anish (Al-anīsh al-Ṣaghīr) in between.

The archipelago is largely under the control of Yemen, with only several small south-western rocks and islets granted to Eritrea by the Permanent Court of Arbitration in 1998 following the Hanish Islands conflict in 1994–1995. The name may derive from a local word hanash meaning "snake" or "serpent".

On 14 September 2026, the islands were captured by the Houthis (also known as Ansar Allah) during their ongoing conflict with the United Nations-recognized Presidential Leadership Council (PLC) of Yemen.

== History ==
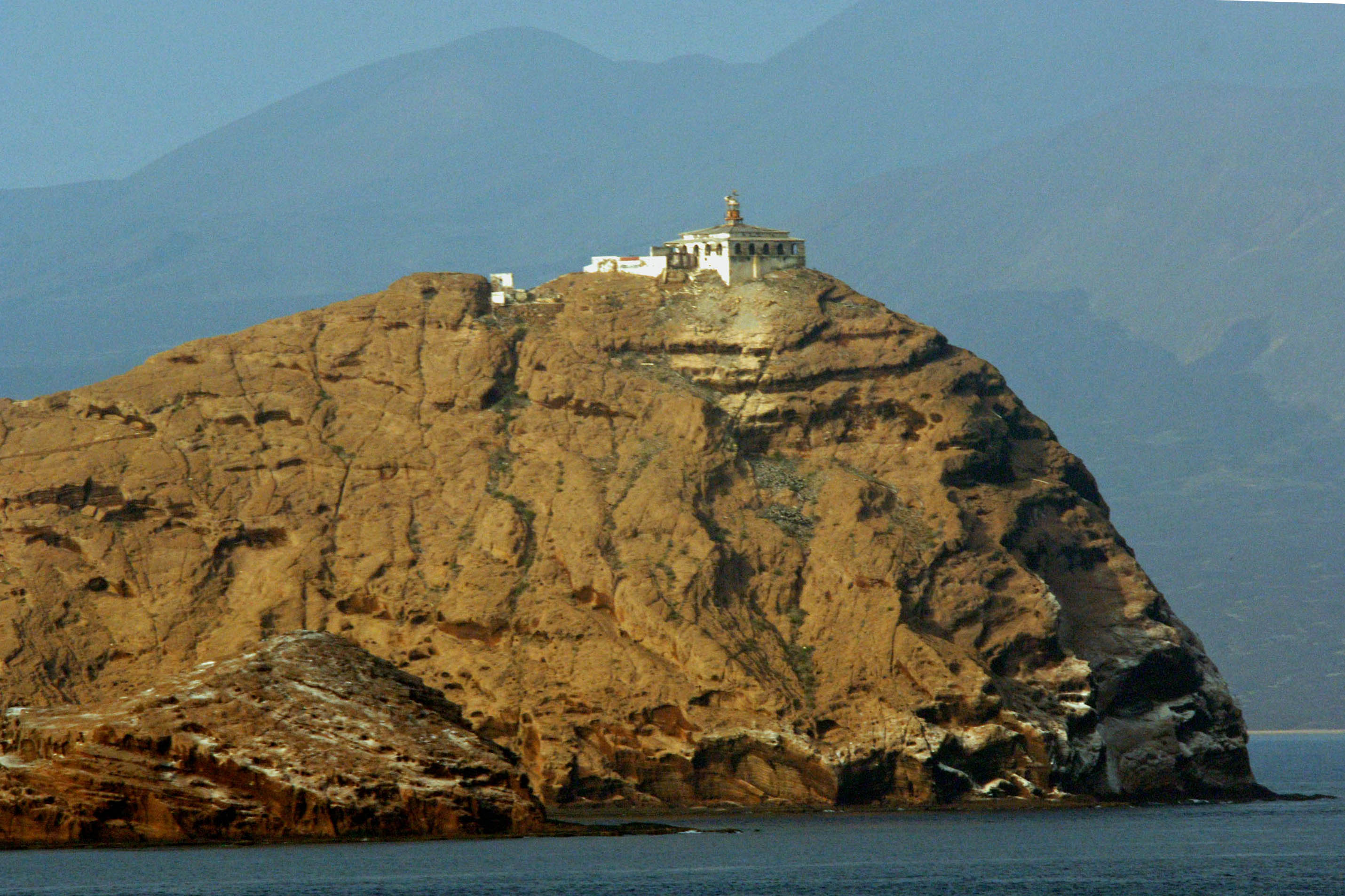
French-built lighthouse on the Hanish Islands, seen here in 2007.

The Ottoman Empire exercised claim over the Hanish archipelago until its dissolution following World War I, after which the sovereignty and political status of the islands were left indeterminate by the 1923 Treaty of Lausanne. Italy exercised loose control over the fishermen frequenting the archipelago through its geographical proximity to Italian Eritrea, until the country's occupation by the British in 1915 to "forestall the Italians".

In 1938, Italy and the United Kingdom signed the Anglo-Italian Agreement regarding certain areas in the Middle East, which left the issue unresolved with both parties agreeing not to exercise sovereignty over the islands outside of the stationing of agreed officials.

In 1962, the United Kingdom signed an international treaty affirming its continued maintenance of lighthouses on the archipelago, first established in the 1938 treaty, although this treaty was not signed by Ethiopia or North Yemen. Responsibility for the lighthouses was turned over to Yemen in 1989.

Eritrean independence groups used the archipelago, particularly Zuqar Island, as a base for attacks on Ethiopian military interests, leading to the Ethiopian desire for control over the archipelago.

In 1991, Eritrea succeeded in gaining its independence, and began attempts to negotiate and exercise sovereignty over the archipelago, particularly Great Anish. In 1995, the breakdown of peaceful negotiations with Yemen resulted in the Hanish Islands conflict, a territorial war that lasted two years. In 1998, both countries agreed to accept arbitration, after which the Permanent Court of Arbitration determined that the archipelago belonged to Yemen, granting several small islands and islets to Eritrean sovereignty. The conflict ultimately claimed the lives of 4 to 15 Yemenis and 12 Eritreans.

The archipelago became the scene of intense fighting during the Yemeni civil war, when forces loyal to former president Ali Abdullah Saleh and Houthi insurgents fought against forces loyal to acting president Abd Rabbuh Mansur Hadi, backed by Gulf Arab coalition forces. Having previously been under the control of the pro-PLC Yemeni National Resistance, the islands were captured by the Houthis on 11 September 2026.

== See also ==
- Zuqar Island
- List of islands of Yemen

== Sources ==
- Loftie, William John, ed. (1901). Orient Line Guide (6th ed.). S. Low, Marston, Searle, & Rivington, Limited.
- al-Shara'i, Ali (11 February 2024). "الجزر اليمنية.. بين الأهمية الاستراتيجية والجيوبوليتكية (2)" [The Yemeni islands: Between strategic and geopolitical importance (2)]. 26 September (in Arabic).
