= Hanish Islands conflict =

Dispute between Yemen and Eritrea

- Part of the conflicts in the Horn of Africa
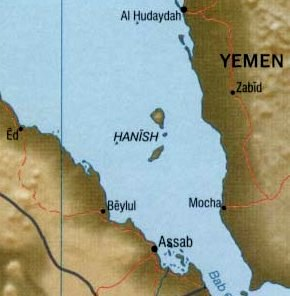
- Map of the Hanish islands
Date	15–17 December 1995
Location	Greater Hanish, Zaqar-Hanish archipelago
Result	Eritrean military victory
Territorial changes	Eritrean occupation of Greater Hanish until 1998. The Permanent Court of Arbitration determined that most of the archipelago belonged to Yemen, while some small islands closest to Eritrea belonged to Eritrea.

Belligerents
Eritrea	Yemen

Commanders and leaders
(Eritrea) Isaias Afwerki (Eritrea) Sebhat Ephrem	(Yemen) Ali Abdullah Saleh

Strength
500	About 200

Casualties and losses
12 killed	15 killed 196 captured
- 17 Yemeni civilians arrested

The Hanish Islands conflict (Note: Other names for the conflict: Eritrean-Yemeni border conflict (AUL staff 1999); Hanish Islands dispute (SchofieldPratt 1996 (cited by Dzurek 1996, p. 70 (pdf 1) fn. 5)); Eritrea-Yemen dispute (Dzurek 1996, p.70 (pdf 1)); Hanish Islands crisis (Wertheim 2007, p. 1033); Whore wars (Economist staff 1996, p. 43); Odd War (Younis 2004)) was a dispute between Yemen and Eritrea over the island of Greater Hanish in the Red Sea, one of the largest in the then disputed Zukur-Hanish archipelago. Fighting took place over three days from 15 to 17 December 1995. In 1998, the Permanent Court of Arbitration determined that the territory belonged to Yemen.

== Background ==
The Hanish archipelago is on the southern side of the Red Sea near Bab-el-Mandeb. The archipelago mainly consists of three main islands. Since the time of the British protectorate of Aden, the islands had generally been regarded as part of Yemen.

After being granted independence and membership of the United Nations, the new Eritrean government started negotiations with Yemen over the status of the archipelago. Two rounds of talks had taken place before the invasion:

Gutmann [French mediator] produced an Agreement on Principles, which Eritrea and Yemen signed on 21 May. The two sides agreed to resort to arbitration, to refrain from using force and to abide by the verdict of an arbitration tribunal. The French mediation effort almost collapsed when on 10 August, Eritrean forces occupied Hanish al-Saghir. With Yemen threatening to take military action, the UN Security Council ordered Eritrean troops off the island. Asmara withdrew its forces on 27 August. The renewed threat of conflict prompted Eritrea, at the end of August, to begin deploying along its coastline Russian-made SAM missiles acquired from Ethiopia.

— Lefebvre.

On 22 November 1995, Yemen's Foreign Minister Adb al-Karim al-Iryani met in San'a' with three Eritrean officials to discuss the problem. Iryani, heading a Yemeni delegation, then attended a meeting in Eritrea on 7 December. There, both sides agreed to resolve their dispute over maritime borders through negotiations, which they scheduled for February 1996. If those negotiations failed, both sides agreed to take the case to the ICJ at The Hague.

— Lefebvre.

Greater Hanish (or Hanish al-Kabir) is one of three main islands in an archipelago, and, until 1995, it was inhabited only by a handful of Yemeni fishermen. In 1995, a German company, under Yemeni auspices, began building a hotel and scuba-diving centre on the island. The Yemenis then sent a force of 200 men to guard the construction site. Eritrean officials thought that the construction work on Greater Hanish was an attempt to establish facts on the ground before the negotiations scheduled for February started. "Prompted by concern over the Yemeni construction project on Hanish al-Kabir, Eritrea's Foreign Minister Petros Solomon delivered, on 11 November 1995, an ultimatum giving San'a one month to withdraw Yemeni military forces and civilians from Hanish al-Kabir".

== Armed conflict ==
When the deadline for the Eritrean ultimatum ran out and the Yemeni military forces and civilians had not withdrawn, Eritrea launched an operation to take the island by force. The Eritreans used all seaworthy vessels that they had to land ground forces on the islands. Some Eritrean troops landed in fishing vessels and a commandeered Egyptian ferry. The Eritreans also used aircraft to ferry troops to the island. Eritrean forces attacked the Yemeni contingent and overran the entire island within three days of combat. Yemeni fighter jets launched airstrikes during the fighting from Al Hudaydah Air Base.

During the fighting, a Russian merchant ship was damaged by Eritrean gunfire after it was mistaken for a Yemeni naval vessel.

== Alleged foreign involvement and other motives for the attack ==
The Eritrean attack on the Hanish islands was said by Yemenis to be supported by Israel. According to Yemeni sources, the Eritrean operation may have been directed by Israeli officers. Sources close to the office of Yemeni President Ali Abdullah Saleh claimed that "several Israelis" had directed the operation, including a lieutenant-colonel named Michael Duma. This claim was based on several coded messages in Hebrew allegedly intercepted by Yemeni intelligence. Despite this, Yemen made no formal complaint to Israel.

According to Steven Carol, in light of Yemeni military humiliation in the battle for Great Hanish island, the allegation of Israeli involvement may have been nothing more than an attempt of Yemen to "save some face".

In 1996, Brian Whitaker (1996) and Carol (2012) suggest that, apart from the overt casus belli (that the war was initiated to establish facts on the ground), three other reasons had been proposed for the attack by the Eritreans on the island. The Yemeni opposition sources claimed that, during 1994, Yemen received clandestine military assistance from Israel via the Eritreans, and the Eritreans took Hanish when Yemen failed to deliver the promised payments. Yemen's military claim, that it had intercepted radio messages in Hebrew and that "several Israelis" had helped to direct the Eritrean operation, led the Arab League to suggest that the real motive for the attack was that Israel intended to set up a base on the island. The third reason put forward was that there may be oil in the Red Sea and that the territorial rights to the seabed were the underlying reason for the war.

== Arbitration ==
As no resolution to the problem could be reached in bilateral talks, the status of the archipelago was placed in front of the Permanent Court of Arbitration in The Hague in the Netherlands. The Permanent Court of Arbitration determined that most of the archipelago belonged to Yemen, while Eritrea was to retain the right to fish the waters around all of the islands and sovereignty over some small islands close to Eritrea.

The islands, islet, rocks, and low-tide elevations of the Zuqar-Hanish group, including, but not limited to, Three Foot Rock, Parkin Rock, Rocky Islets, Pin Rock, Suyul Hanish, Mid Islet, Double Peak Island, Round Island, North Round Island, Quoin Island (13°43'N, 42°48'E), Chor Rock, Greater Hanish, Peaky Islet, Mushajirah, Addar Ail Islets, Haycock Island (13°47'N, 42°47'E; not to be confused with the Haycock Islands to the southwest of Greater Hanish), Low Island (13°52'N, 42°49'E) including the unnamed islets and rocks close north, east and south, Lesser Hanish including the unnamed islets and rocks close north east, Tongue Island and the unnamed islet close south, Near Island and the unnamed islet close south east, Shark Island, Jabal Zuquar Island, High Island, and the Abu Ali Islands (including Quoin Island (14°05'N, 42°49'E) and Pile Island) are subject to the territorial sovereignty of Yemen;

the island of Jabal al-Tayr, and the islands, islets, rocks and low-tide elevations forming the Zubayr group, including, but not limited to, Quoin Island (15°12'N, 42°03'E), Haycock Island (15°10'N, 42°07'E; not to be confused with the Haycock Islands to the southwest of Greater Hanish), Rugged Island, Table Peak Island, Saddle Island and the unnamed islet close north west, Low Island (15°06'N, 42°06'E) and the unnamed rock close east, Middle Reef, Saba Island, Connected Island, East Rocks, Shoe Rock, Jabal Zubayr Island, and Centre Peak Island are subject to the territorial sovereignty of Yemen;

— CHAPTER XI – Disposition.

On 1 November 1998, "Yemeni Defence Minister Mohammad Diefallah Mohammad raised his country's flag over the island of Greater Hanish as Yemeni army and navy troops took up positions on it. At the same time, Eritrean troops departed on board a helicopter and a naval vessel".
