= List of shipwrecks in June 1855 =

The list of shipwrecks in June 1855 includes ships sunk, wrecked, grounded, or otherwise lost during June 1855.

== 1 June ==
List of shipwrecks: 1 June 1855
Ship	State	Description
Benjamin Elkins; Coupland; Emma; John Patchett; Manette; Miguel	United Kingdom; United States; Hamburg; United Kingdom; France; Peru	The barque Manette was driven into Benjamin Elkin at Mazatlan, Cuba. She was then driven into the barque Emma, crushed the barque John Patchett and the schooners Coupland and Miguel before drifting out to sea and foundering with the loss of fifteen of her sixteen crew. Benjamin Elkins was abandoned as a wreck with the loss of three of her eighteen crew. John Patchett was abandoned as a wreck, her twelve crew were rescued. Coupland was wrecked with the loss of four of her crew. Miguel was also wrecked.
Bouvreuil	France	The ship was driven ashore near Jacmel, Haiti. She was on a voyage from the Rio de la Hacha to Havre de Grâce, Seine-Inférieure.
Colbert	French Navy	The paddle corvette ran aground at Nagasaki, Japan and was abandoned by her crew.
Happy Return	United Kingdom	The ship ran aground at Sunderland, County Durham and was beached at Sand Point. She was on a voyage from Sunderland to Aberdeen.
Hero	Bremen	The brig was driven ashore at Mazatlan.
Jeune Alexandre	France	The ship was driven ashore at Lowestoft, Suffolk, United Kingdom. Her crew were rescued. She was on a voyage from Caen, Caen to Newcastle upon Tyne, Northumberland, United Kingdom.
Tartar	United Kingdom	The barque was driven ashore and wrecked at Mazatlan with the loss of four of her crew.
Volusia	United Kingdom	The ship ran aground on the Little Burbo Bank, in Liverpool Bay. She was on a voyage from Swansea, Glamorgan to Liverpool, Lancashire. She was refloated and taken into Liverpool.

== 2 June ==
List of shipwrecks: 2 June 1855
Ship	State	Description
Graf von Munster	Kingdom of Hanover	The ship was wrecked at Norden. She was on a voyage from "Domersiel" to an English port.
Harmonie	United Kingdom	The ship was driven ashore at Danzig. She was on a voyage from Danzig to London, United Kingdom.
Hope	United Kingdom	The schooner was abandoned in the Bristol Channel with the loss of two of the five people on board. She was on a voyage from Poole, Dorset to Runcorn, Cheshire. She was taken in to Llanelly, Glamorgan in a derelict condition.
Water Witch	United States	The clipper was driven ashore and wrecked at Ypala, Mexico.

== 3 June ==
List of shipwrecks: 3 June 1855
Ship	State	Description
Edgar	United States	The ship was wrecked on Iony Island in the western Sea of Okhotsk in fog. All aboard were saved by nearby vessels.

== 4 June ==
List of shipwrecks: 4 June 1855
Ship	State	Description
Lochmaben Castle	United Kingdom	The ship was wrecked on the Bird Rocks, in the Gulf of Saint Lawrence. Her crew and 557 passengers were rescued; Her crew and 120 passengers by Sophia Kidson, 210 passengers by Sophia McKenzie (both United Kingdom).
Tolve Brodie	Norway	The full-rigged ship ran aground off the coast of South Holland, Netherlands.

== 5 June ==
List of shipwrecks: 5 June 1855
Ship	State	Description
Abrota	(United Kingdom of Great Britain and Ireland) Jersey	The barque was wrecked on Klein Curaçao. Her crew were rescued. She was on a voyage from Llanelly, Glamorgan to Curaçao.
Imperatrice	United Kingdom	The steamship was in collision with the brigantine Commerce (Belgium in the English Channel off Dungeness, Kent. She consequently foundered in the Swin, off the coast of Essex the next day whilst attempting to put in to Sheerness, Kent. Her crew were rescued by the tug Trinity (United Kingdom). Imperatrice was on a voyage from Woolwich, Kent to the Crimea. She was refloated on 10 August and taken in to Ramsgate, Kent.

== 6 June ==
List of shipwrecks: 6 June 1855
Ship	State	Description
Erie	United States	The brig ran aground on a reef off Aux Cayes, Haiti. She was on a voyage from Aux Cayes to Boston, Massachusetts.
Katherine Sharer	United Kingdom	The barque caught fire and exploded at Hobart, Van Diemen's Land. All on board survived. She was on a voyage from London to Hobart.
Maiden City	United Kingdom	The steamship struck a rock off Maughold Head, Isle of Man and sank. All on board were rescued; some of her passengers were rescued by the steamship Lyra (United Kingdom). Maiden City was on a voyage from Liverpool, Lancashire to Londonderry.
Wellgung	Sweden	The ship sprang a leak and was beached at "Ibou", Denmark. She was on a voyage from Uddevalla to Horsens, Denmark.

== 7 June ==
List of shipwrecks: 7 June 1855
Ship	State	Description
Jefferson	United States	The ship wrecked on Cape Levenshtern, on the northeast coast of Sakhalin Island, in the western Sea of Okhotsk in fog. The entire crew, 300 barrels of whale oil, and 3,000 pounds (1,361 kg) of baleen were saved by the ship Reindeer (United States).
Panama	United States	The steamship was driven ashore and severely damaged at Taboga, Republic of New Granada. She was refloated and taken to San Francisco, California for repairs.

== 8 June ==
List of shipwrecks: 8 June 1855
Ship	State	Description
Fanny Forrester	United States	The ship ran aground on the Long Bank, in the Irish Sea off the coast of County Wexford, United Kingdom. She was later refloated and completed her voyage to Liverpool, Lancashire, United Kingdom, arriving on 10 June.

== 9 June ==
List of shipwrecks: 9 June 1855
Ship	State	Description
Gondola	United Kingdom	The ship was last sighted on this date whilst on a voyage from Salonica, Greece to Queenstown, County Cork. No further trace, presumed foundered with the loss of all hands.
HMS Nerbudda	Royal Navy	The brig-sloop departed from the Cape of Good Hope, Cape Colony. No further trace, presumed foundered with the loss of 120 all hands, possibly on 12 or 13 June in a typhoon.

== 12 June ==
List of shipwrecks: 12 June 1855
Ship	State	Description
Indianaren	Denmark	The barque collided with the coaster Tocontuis (Brazil) and foundered 35 nautical miles (65 km) off Cape Frio, Brazil. All on board were rescued. She was on a voyage from Hamburg to Rio de Janeiro, Brazil.

== 14 June ==
List of shipwrecks: 14 June 1855
Ship	State	Description
Gazelle	United Kingdom	The brig struck an iceberg in the Atlantic Ocean. She was abandoned on 17 June and foundered. Her crew were rescued by Sovereign (United Kingdom). Gazelle was on a voyage from London to Newfoundland, British North America.
St. Abbs	United Kingdom	The East Indiaman was wrecked on a reef off St. Jean Nova Island, north east of Madagascar with the loss of 22-29 lives. There were six survivors. She was on a voyage from London to Calcutta, India.

== 15 June ==
List of shipwrecks: 15 June 1855
Ship	State	Description
Charles	United Kingdom	The schooner ran aground on the Pakefield Gat, in the North Sea off the coast of Suffolk. She was on a voyage from Hartlepool, County Durham to Exeter, Devon. She was refloated and taken in to Lowestoft, Suffolk in a leaky condition.
Energy	United Kingdom	The ship was driven ashore in the Sound of Skye. She was reported to be on a voyage from South Shields, County Durham to Dunkirk, Nord, France. She was refloated on 27 June.
Fame	United Kingdom	The ship ran aground on the Sizewell Bank, in the North Sea off the coast of Suffolk. She was on a voyage from Grangemouth, Stirlingshire to London. She was refloated and put in to Lowestoft, Suffolk in a leaky condition.
Guineaman	United Kingdom	The schooner was wrecked on Scroby Sands, Norfolk. Her crew were rescued. She was on a voyage from Sunderland, County Durham to Bordeaux, Gironde.

== 16 June ==
List of shipwrecks: 16 June 1855
Ship	State	Description
Bristol Packet	United Kingdom	The ship was driven ashore at Wainfleet, Lincolnshire. She was on a voyage from Boston, Lincolnshire to London.
Charles	United Kingdom	The ship ran aground in the North Sea. She was on a voyage from Hartlepool, County Durham to Exeter, Devon. She was refloated and put in to Great Yarmouth, Norfolk in a leaky condition.
Posto	Denmark	The brigantine was driven ashore on Læsø. She was on a voyage from Hartlepool, County Durham, United Kingdom to Aalborg. She was refloated the next day and put in to Fredrikshavn.
Thomas	United Kingdom	The ship ran aground on the Newcombe Sand, in the North Sea off the coast of Suffolk. She was on a voyage from Woodbridge, Suffolk to Goole, Yorkshire. She was refloated and put in to Lowestoft, Suffolk.

== 17 June ==
List of shipwrecks: 17 June 1855
Ship	State	Description
Phoque	France	The brig ran aground on the Margate Sand, in the North Sea off the coast of Kent, United Kingdom. Her crew were rescued by the steamship Prince of Wales (United Kingdom). Phoque was on a voyage from Sunderland, County Durham, United Kingdom to Nantes, Loire-Inférieure.
Robert and John	United Kingdom	The sloop ran aground on the Hale Sand, in the North Sea off the coast of Lincolnshire. She was on a voyage from Grimsby to Louth, Lincolnshire.

== 18 June ==
List of shipwrecks: 18 June 1855
Ship	State	Description
Mona	United Kingdom	The brig ran aground on the South Bull in the Irish Sea. She was on a voyage from Maryport, Cumberland to Drogheda, County Louth.
Oldenburg	Kingdom of Hanover	The schooner ran aground on the Ower Sand, in the North Sea. She was on a voyage from Hartlepool, County Durham, United Kingdom to Singapore, Straits Settlements. She was refloated and put in to Great Yarmouth, Norfolk, United Kingdom in a leaky condition.
Supply	United Kingdom	The ship was wrecked on the Hinder Bank, in the North Sea off the Dutch coast. Her crew were rescued. She was on a voyage from Newcastle upon Tyne, Northumberland to Rotterdam, South Holland, Netherlands.

== 20 June ==
List of shipwrecks: 20 June 1855
Ship	State	Description
Frederick	United Kingdom	The ship sprang a leak and sank. She was on a voyage from Bo'ness, Lothian to Stettin.
Maria Sophia	Prussia	The ship sprang a leak and foundered in the Baltic Sea. She was on a voyage from Wolgast to Stettin.

== 21 June ==
List of shipwrecks: 21 June 1855
Ship	State	Description
Industry	United Kingdom	The brigantine was driven ashore at Cape George, Nova Scotia, British North America. She was on a voyage from Prince Edward Island, British North America to Liverpool, Lancashire.
Sumpter	United Kingdom	The ship ran ashore at Quoddy Head, Maine, United States. She was on a voyage from Musquash, New Brunswick, British North America to Cork. She was refloated and put in to Boston, Massachusetts, United States in a leaky condition.

== 22 June ==
List of shipwrecks: 22 June 1855
Ship	State	Description
Anne	United Kingdom	The ship was driven ashore at "Portlozan". She was on a voyage from Ardrossan, Ayrshire to Fleetwood, Lancashire. She was refloated on 9 July and towed in to Ardrossan.
Manilla	United Kingdom	The ship ran aground at Sagua La Grande, Cuba. She was refloated on 6 July and sailed for Cowes, Isle of Wight.

== 24 June ==
List of shipwrecks: 24 June 1855
Ship	State	Description
Nancy Plaisted	United States	The ship was driven ashore on Fire Island, New York. She was on a voyage from Madeira to New York City. She had sunk by 30 June.

== 25 June ==
List of shipwrecks: 25 June 1855
Ship	State	Description
T. and P. Woodward	United Kingdom	The ship was wrecked on the Hogsty Reef. Her crew were rescued. She was on a voyage from St. Jago de Cuba, Cuba to Swansea, Glamorgan.

== 26 June ==
List of shipwrecks: 26 June 1855
Ship	State	Description
Rosario	Uruguay	The ship departed from Montevideo for Falmouth, Cornwall, United Kingdom. No further trace, presumed foundered in the Atlantic Ocean with the loss of all hands.

== 28 June ==
List of shipwrecks: 28 June 1855
Ship	State	Description
Telegraph	Belgium	The steamship ran aground in the Oost Gat. She was on a voyage from Antwerp to Hull, Yorkshire, United Kingdom.

== 29 June ==
List of shipwrecks: 29 June 1855
Ship	State	Description
Harvest	United Kingdom	The ship was driven ashore at Middlesbrough, Yorkshire. She was on a voyage from Middlesbrough to Newhaven, Sussex. She was refloated the next day and towed in to Middlesbrough.
Lightfoot	United States	The clipper was wrecked in the Hooghly River at Saugor, India.
Witness	(United Kingdom of Great Britain and Ireland) New Zealand	The brigantine was wrecked at Palliser Bay when she was caught in a gale. She was en route from Port Cooper (Lyttelton) to Melbourne. One life was lost.

== 30 June ==
List of shipwrecks: 30 June 1855
Ship	State	Description
Ashley	United Kingdom	The barque was destroyed by fire at Gibraltar. She was on a voyage from Liverpool, Lancashire to Constantinople, Ottoman Empire.
Glenroy	United Kingdom	The full-rigged ship ran aground on the Blackwater Bank, in the Irish Sea off the coast of County Wexford. She was on a voyage from the Clyde to Melbourne, Victoria. She was refloated and resumed her voyage.

== Unknown date ==
List of shipwrecks: Unknown date in June 1855
Ship	State	Description
HMS Amphion	Royal Navy	Crimean War: The frigate ran aground at Sveaborg, Grand Duchy of Finland and was damaged by Russian artillery fire. She was refloated.
Ann	United Kingdom	The schooner foundered in the Irish Sea on or before 10 June. She was on a voyage from Ardrossan, Ayrshire to Limerick.
Atrato	United Kingdom	The barque was wrecked on Klein Curaçao, Curaçao in early June. She was on a voyage from Sunderland, County Durham to Curaçao.
Belzunce	France	The ship was wrecked at Île Bourbon in late June.
Cette	France	The ship was driven ashore at Alexandria, Egypt before 30 June. She was on a voyage from Newcastle upon Tyne, Northumberland, United Kingdom to Alexandria.
Contractor	United Kingdom	The tug sank off Queenstown, County Cork. She was on a voyage from Queenstown to the Crimea. She was refloated on 26 June and taken in to Dublin for repairs.
Echo	(United Kingdom of Great Britain and Ireland) Victoria	The ship was driven ashore at the Melbourne Heads. She was on a voyage from Melbourne to Callao, Peru. She was refloated on 16 June and resumed her voyage.
Emma Jane	United Kingdom	The ship was driven ashore on Rügen, Prussia. She was on a voyage from Stornoway, Isle of Lewis, Outer Hebrides to Stettin. She was refloated on 6 June and taken in to Stralsund for repairs.
Gale	United Kingdom	The schooner was driven ashore at Deal, Kent. She was refloated on 15 June and sailed to the north.
Leavet Storar	Spain	The ship was wrecked on Sandy Cay before 23 June. She was on a voyage from New Orleans, Louisiana, United States to Vigo.
Huron	(United Kingdom of Great Britain and Ireland) British North America	The steamship sank off Oswego. She was later refloated and taken in to Quebec City, Province of Canada.
Infanta	United Kingdom	The ship was abandoned in the Atlantic Ocean before 15 June.
J. Bhobet	United States	The ship was abandoned in the Atlantic Ocean before 15 June.
John Hussey	(United Kingdom of Great Britain and Ireland) Van Diemen's Land	The ship was driven ashore at the mouth of the Mersey River. She had been refloated by 12 June.
Margaret and Mary	United Kingdom	The brig was abandoned in the Atlantic Ocean before 13 June.
Mary and Jane	United Kingdom	The schooner was abandoned in the North Sea (56°06′N 6°45′E) before 10 June.
Norval	Netherlands	The ship was wreck on the Bol of the Hinder, in the North Sea on or before 18 June. Her crew were rescued. she was on a voyage from Newcastle upon Tyne to Rotterdam, South Holland.
Whitburn Grange	United Kingdom	The ship was driven ashore south of Bridlington, Yorkshire. She was refloated on 14 June and takin in to Bridlington.
