= Okamoto Kansuke =

- 岡本 監輔
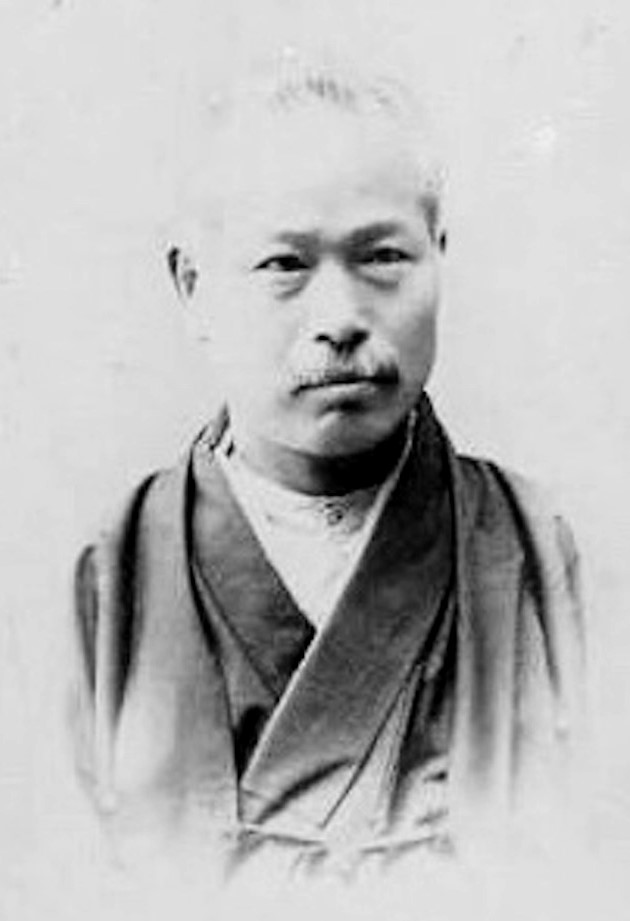

Personal details
- Born: November 22, 1839 Mima, Awa Province, Japan
- Died: November 9, 1904 (aged 64) Tokyo, Japan

Okamoto Kansuke (Japanese: 岡本 監輔; 1839–1904) was a Japanese kangaku scholar and adventurer. He is remembered as an activist for the Japanese colonization of Sakhalin.

== Biography ==
Okamoto was born to a family of farmers. At an early age he became fascinated with Japan's northern frontiers.

In 1863 and again in 1865 Okamoto undertook pioneering expeditions to Sakhalin. On the second journey, accompanied by the ashigaru Nishimura Denkurō (西村 伝九郎) and several Ainu, he became the first Japanese to reach Cape Elizabeth at the island's northernmost point where he built a small shrine to Amaterasu. Along the way, Okamoto's team studied the language and culture of the Karafuto Ainu. He built a cabin in the village of Kushunkotan, later called Ōdomari, where he served as a leader of Japanese settlers.

On June 24, 1869, a Russian warship arrived at Kushunkotan and sent a landing party ashore. The Russians occupied a cemetery and began digging earthworks for a small fort, destroying the graves in the process. After the villagers' protests were ignored, Okamoto departed Sakhalin on the 27th to alert the Japanese government. On September 22, he returned to Kushunkotan along with a number of officials including Maruyama Sakura. Because it was unclear whether Japan or Russia held sovereignty over Sakhalin, Okamoto was unable to expel the Russians and could only attempt to calm the outraged Japanese residents.

Okamoto believed that the island of Sakhalin held vast natural resources and was of such immense strategic importance that Japan needed to take possession of it at all costs. In 1870, Okamoto resigned after coming into conflict with Karafuto Governor Kuroda Kiyotaka over the Japanese government's policy of appeasement towards Russia.

In 1875, Japan and Russia signed the Treaty of Saint Petersburg by which Japan ceded all of Sakhalin in exchange for the Kuril Islands, bringing Okamoto's life's work to nought.

Okamoto later traveled to Taiwan where he worked as a Japanese language teacher.

In 1903, Okamoto suffered a brain hemorrhage that paralyzed both his arms. After the Russo-Japanese War broke out the following year, he listened attentively to reports from the front. He died at his home in 1904. His death came months before Southern Sakhalin was returned to Japan by the Treaty of Portsmouth.
