= Oremif =

Oremif Остров Оримиф
- Island
- Location within Khabarovsk Krai
- Coordinates: 52°58′N 141°4′E
- Country: Russian Federation
- Federal subject: Khabarovsk Krai

Oremif Island (Остров Оримиф) is an island in the Sakhalin Gulf, at the southern end of the Sea of Okhotsk. It is located in the Amur Liman, about 3 km from the shore.

== Geography ==
Oremif is horseshoe-shaped and it is about 2 km across. 22 km further up the estuary lies Ostrov Vospri.

Administratively Oremif belongs to the Khabarovsk Krai of the Russian Federation.

Oremif Island should not be confused with the settlement called Oremif located on the Amur's estuary shore, about 5 km to the NE of the island.
