= Schmidt Peninsula =

Schmidt Peninsula may refer to:

- Schmidt Peninsula (Antarctica)
- Schmidt Peninsula (Sakhalin), Russia
