= Ush =

USH may refer to:

- Ush Island, a Russian island in the Sea of Okhotsk
- Ush, king of Umma, King or ensi of Umma, a city-state in Sumer, circa 2450 BCE
- Ugandan shilling (abbreviated USh), the currency of Uganda
- Universal Studios Hollywood, the movie studio and theme park in Los Angeles, California
- Ushuaia – Malvinas Argentinas International Airport, in Ushuaia, Argentina (IATA airport code)
- Union School Haiti
