= Cape Khalpili =

Cape in Sakhalin Oblast, Russia

Cape Khalpili is a cape on Sakhalin island, in Sakhalin Oblast of the Far Eastern Federal District, Russia.

The Khalpili Islands are off the cape's coast. They are an island group of the Kuril Islands, in the Sea of Okhotsk of the North Pacific region.
