= Morskaya Matuga =

- Island
- Location within Magadan Oblast
- Coordinates: 61.3782°N 159.9509°E
- Country: Russian Federation
- Federal subject: Far Eastern Federal District
- Oblast: Magadan Oblast

Morskaya Matuga, also Ostrovok Morskaya Matuga or Motuga, is an islet in the Sea of Okhotsk, roughly 9 miles northeastward of the northern Khalpili Islet. It is described as "a precipitous flat-topped islet".
