= Sakhalin Gulf =

Gulf in the Sea of Okhotsk

Coordinates: 53°40′32.02″N 141°32′22.60″E

Sakhalin Gulf (Russian: Сахалинский залив) is a gulf in the Sea of Okhotsk between continental Russia (north of the Amur's mouth) and the Schmidt Peninsula, at the northern tip of Sakhalin Island. The width of the gulf reaches up to 160 km (99 mi). It is covered with ice from mid-November until late April, but north winds can leave the bay blocked with ice until July.

The port of Moskalvo (Москальво) is located on the eastern shore of the Sakhalin Gulf, close to Ush Island.

== History ==
Sakhalin Gulf was frequented by American and Russian whaleships targeting bowhead whales between 1848 and 1874. They also traded with the natives for fish. On 6–7 September 1854, the ship City (351 tons), of New Bedford, grounded and wrecked on the western side of the gulf. Most of her crew made it to Sakhalin Island, but seven men, including the first officer, perished on a raft from the wreck of the bark Peruvian. They were able to reach the Russian village of Petrovsk and boarded a brig for home.

== Wildlife ==
In the summer beluga whales aggregate at the head of Sakhalin Gulf to feed on spawning salmon.
