= Ilyinskoye, Sakhalin Oblast =

Rural locality in Sakhalin Oblast, Russia; formerly in Japan

Coordinates: 47°59′33.7″N 142°12′19.6″E

Ilyinskoye (Russian: Ильинское, until 1946 Kusunai or Kushunnai (久春内村, Kusunaimura) is a rural locality (selo) in Tomarinsky District, Sakhalin Oblast, Russia.

A settlement on the western coast of Sakhalin Island, by the mouth of the Kusunai River was founded in 1853 by Dmitry Orlov, however, it was later abandoned when all Russian settlements were removed from the island due to the Crimean War. A successor settlement, known as Ilyinsky Post or Kusunai Post, was founded at the same location by Nikolay Rudanovsky on 20 August 1857. In the 1860s this was one of the two settlements on Sakhalin, along with Due, which had a permanent Russian population.

In 1906, after the Russo-Japanese War, following the Treaty of Portsmouth, the Southern Sakhalin was transferred to Japan. Ilyinskoye was renamed Kusunai and became part of Karafuto Prefecture. In 1945, following World War II, it was reoccupied by the Soviet Union. Administratively, on 2 February 1946 South Sakhalin Oblast was created, which was part of Khabarovsk Krai. Kusunai was renamed Ilyinsky, made an urban-type settlement, and included into Tomarinsky District. On 2 January 1947 South Sakhalin Oblast was abolished and merged into Sakhalin Oblast. On 1 January 2005, the urban-type settlement of Ilyinsky was downgraded to selo and renamed Ilyinskoye.

On 25 November 2019, a large power station was opened in Ilyinskoye.
