= Cape Levenshtern =

Cape Levenshtern Мыс Левенштерна
- Location of Cape Levenshtern
- Location of Cape Levenshtern Cape Levenshtern (Sakhalin Oblast)
- Coordinates: 54°04′47″N 142°59′47″E
- Country: Russia
- Federal subject: Sakhalin Oblast

Cape Levenshtern (Russian: Mys Levenshterna) is a cape on the northeast coast of Sakhalin Island in the western Sea of Okhotsk. It is rounded and rugged. It lies 37 km (about 23 mi) to the south-southeast of Cape Elizabeth, the northern point of the island.

== History ==
On the night of 7 June 1855, the ship Jefferson (396 tons), of New London, was wrecked on the cape during a dense fog. All hands were saved by the ship Reindeer, of New Bedford, which also salvaged most of the cargo of oil and bone.
