= Nikolay Rudanovsky =

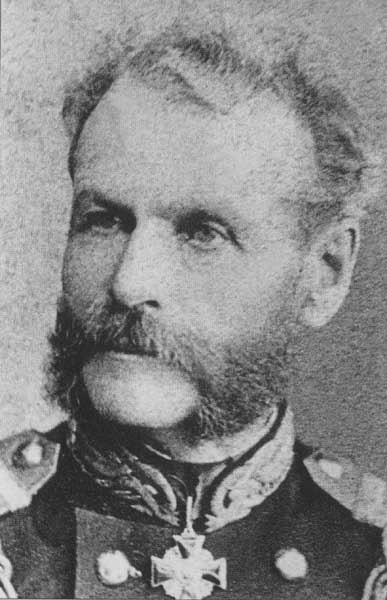
Rudanovsky in 1881

Nikolay Vasilyevich Rudanovsky (Russian: Николай Васильевич Рудановский, 1819 — 1882) was a Russian marine officer and explorer, notable for leading several expeditions in 1853–54 to survey and to map the southern part of Sakhalin. In particular, he became the first European cartographer who surveyed inland areas of the island.

== Biography ==
Rudanovsky was born in 1819 in Vyatka. His father was an officer, a participant of the War of 1812, who subsequently retired from the Army and started a civil service career. In 1841, Rudanovsky completed naval training in Kronstadt and served for 10 years in the Baltic Fleet before being transferred in 1851 to the Kamchatka Flotilla, based in Petropavlovsk-Kamchatsky. In 1853, he was promoted to the rank of lieutenant.

In 1853, Russian colonization of Sakhalin started, and Rudanovsky volunteered to participate. He formed and trained a detachment of 70 soldiers and was, together with the detachment, transferred to the island. Formally, he was employed by the Russian-American Company. The commander of the Amur Expedition, Gennady Nevelskoy, assigned Rudanovsky and his people under the command of Nikolay Busse, who later became the military governor of Amur Oblast. The expedition sailed from Petropavlovsk in August 1853, two days after Busse arrived to Petropavlovsk. In September, they arrived to Sakhalin and founded Muravyovsky Post, the first Russian settlement on the island and the predecessor of the town of Korsakov.

While Rudanovsky was based in Muravyovsky Post, he was tasked with surveying the island. In particular, in late 1853 and early 1854 he mapped the east coast of Aniva Bay and crossed the island to the East to the Sea of Okhotsk. However, in 1854, the Crimean War started, and the Russian Empire was afraid that Great Britain would attack Russian settlements at the Pacific coast. The Amur Expedition was terminated, and on 30 June 1854 Muravyovsky Post was abandoned. Rudanovsky was transferred to Nikolayevsk-on-Amur, where he was mainly surveying the shores of the Amur.

After the war, in July 1856, the military post in Due was founded, which again became the first Russian settlement on the island. In August 1856, Rudanovsky was appointed the military commander of the post, with about 20 people under his command. In July 1857, he was ordered to found a new settlement, Ilyinsky Post, which was abandoned in the same year but again founded at the same location in 1858. At the time, Sakhalin Island was jointly administered by Russia and Japan, however, the Russian government anticipated that it would be divided between the two, and in July 1858 Rudanovsky was ordered to survey the island and determine the location of prospective border. He has surveyed, and later mapped the western coast of Sakhalin between the 47th and the 50th parallel. In 1858, he was transferred to the Baltic Fleet.

On 7 November 1881, Rudanovsky was promoted to counter admiral and simultaneously discharged from the military service. He died on 3 January 1882.
