= Ush Island =

Island in Russia

Ush
- Location within Sakhalin Oblast

Geography
- Location: Sakhalin Gulf
- Coordinates: 53°33′N 142°22′E
- Adjacent to: Sea of Okhotsk
- Length: 14 km (8.7 mi)
- Width: 2.6 km (1.62 mi)

Administration
- Russia
- Oblast: Sakhalin

Ush Island (Остров Уш; Ostrov Ush) is an island in the northern coast of Sakhalin. Ush Island is located between a shallow bay and the Sea of Okhotsk, at the mouth of the Sakhalin Gulf.

Ush Island stretches roughly from east to west. It is 14 km in length and has an average width of 2.6 km. The town of Moskal'vo and a railway line are located in the small peninsula beyond the channel that separates Ush Island from the mainland on its eastern side.

Administratively Ush Island belongs to the Sakhalin Oblast of the Russian Federation.
