= Schmidt Peninsula (Sakhalin) =

Peninsula in Sakhalin Oblast, Russian Federation

Полуостров Шмидта
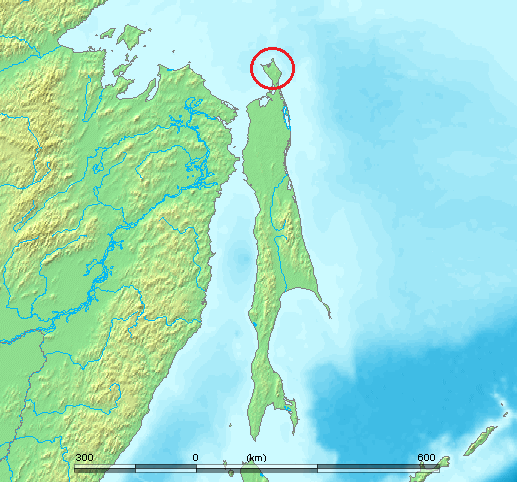
- Location of the Schmidt Peninsula in Sakhalin

- Location within Far Eastern Federal District

Geography
- Location: Sakhalin Oblast, Russia
- Coordinates: 54°08′N 142°44′E
- Adjacent to: Sea of Okhotsk
- Length: 70 km (43 mi)
- Width: 45 km (28 mi)
- Highest elevation: 623 m (2044 ft)
- Highest point: Mt Three Brothers

Administration
- Russia
- Federal subject: Sakhalin Oblast

The Schmidt Peninsula (Russian: Полуостров Шмидта) is a peninsula in Sakhalin Oblast, Russian Federation. It is the northernmost point of Sakhalin Island and is located north of Okha town.

== History ==
The indigenous Nivkh people of northern Sakhalin called the peninsula Mif-Tyongr (Миф-тёнгр), meaning "head of the earth." The name Schmidt Peninsula was chosen by geologist N. Tikhonovich in 1908, in honor of fellow geologist Fyodor Schmidt who had visited Sakhalin in 1866. Previously it had been named "Saint Elizabeth Peninsula" in certain maps. Cape Elizabeth and Cape Mary, the two main headlands of the peninsula, had been named in 1805 by Russian Navy Admiral Ivan Kruzenshtern (1770–1846).

== Geography ==
The Schmidt Peninsula is the northern extremity of Sakhalin Island. There are two roughly parallel mountain ranges stretching in a NNW/SSE direction. The mountains are covered with larch and spruce forests and are separated by a swampy valley. Cape Elizabeth is at the northern end of the Eastern Range and Cape Mary (мыс Марии), the northwestern headland, at the northern end of the lower Western Range. Severny Bay lies between them. To the west lies the Sakhalin Gulf and to the east and north the Sea of Okhotsk. The highest point of the peninsula is 623 m (2,044 ft) high Mount Three Brothers (гора Три Брата), rising in the eastern range.

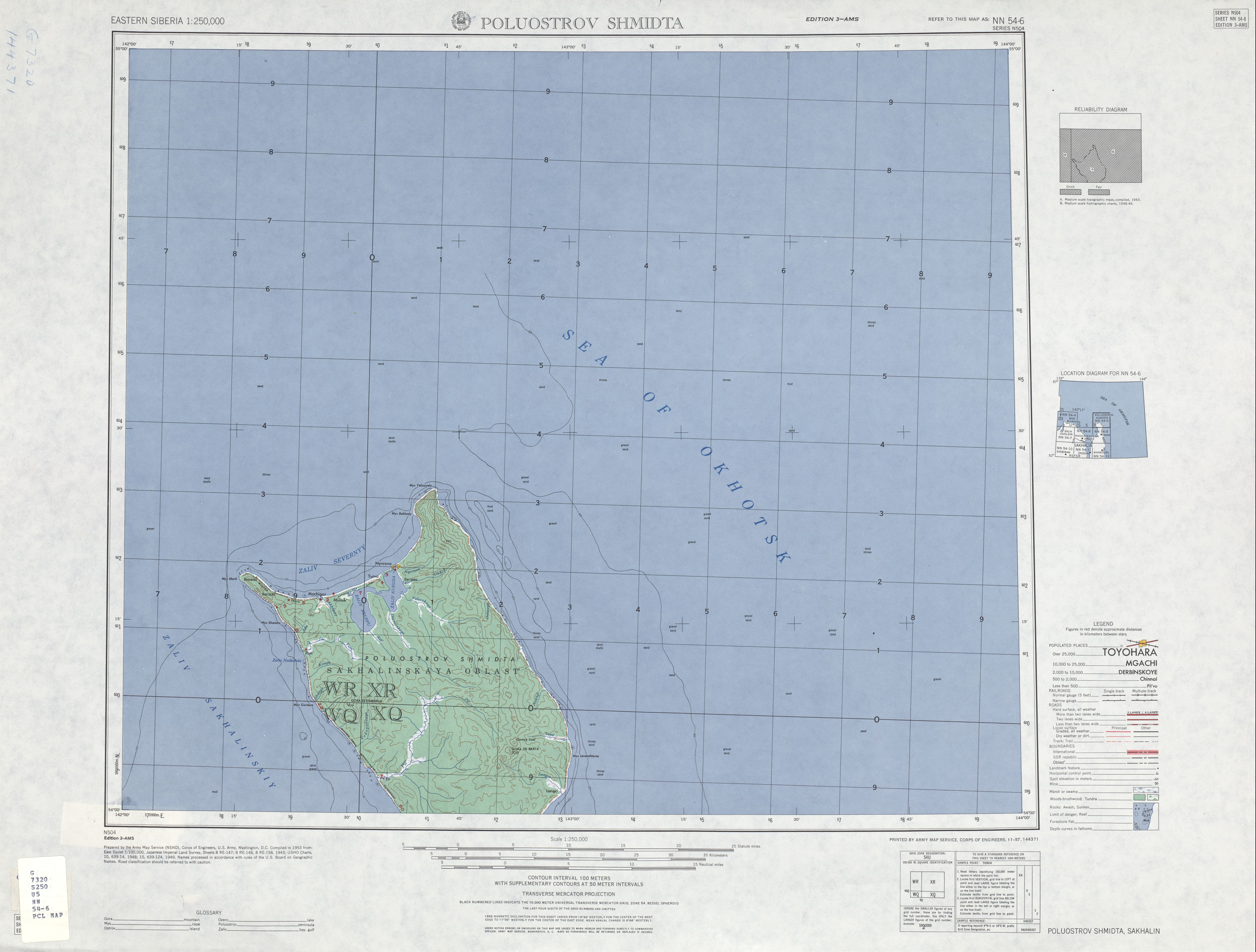
Map of the peninsula (northern part).

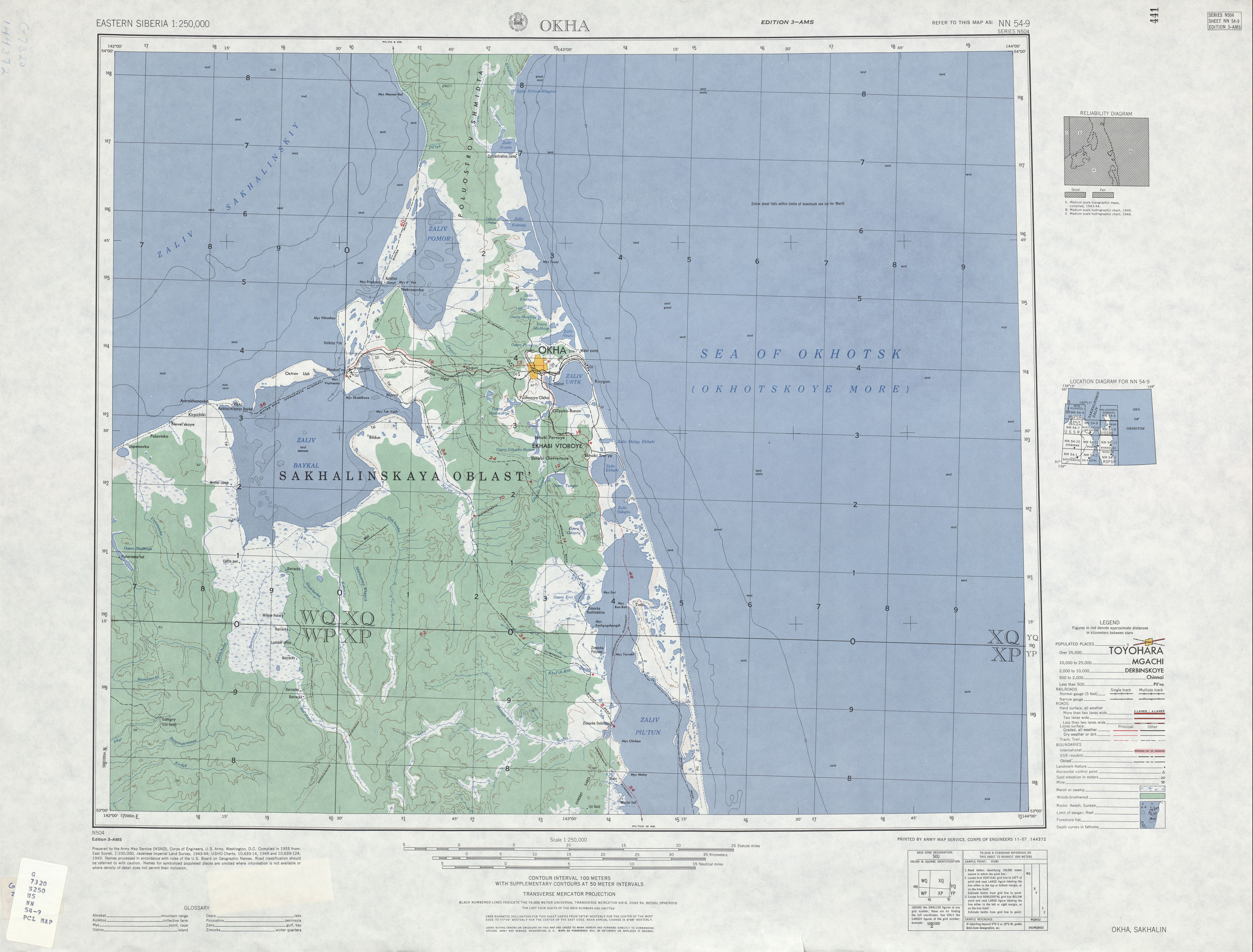
Map of the peninsula (isthmus area).
