= Cape Elizabeth (Sakhalin) =

Cape in Sakhalin Oblast, Russian Federation

Cape Elizabeth Russian: Мыс Елизаветы Japanese: 鵞小門岬
- Cape
- Coordinates: 54°42′22″N 142°42′21.75″E
- Location: Schmidt Peninsula; Sakhalin Oblast, Russia
- Offshore water bodies: Sea of Okhotsk

Area
  - Total: Russian Far East
- Elevation: 539 m (1,768 ft)

Cape Elizabeth (Russian: Мыс Елизаветы, Japanese: 鵞小門岬 "Gaoto-misaki") is a cape on the Schmidt Peninsula. It is the northernmost point of Sakhalin.

Cape Elizabeth was named by Adam Johann von Krusenstern in 1805 after Empress Elizaveta, wife of Alexander I of Russia.

The cape is a territory under administration of the Okhinsky District and was even considered the northernmost point of Japan until the Treaty of Saint Petersburg in 1875 when it was replaced by the northernmost point of Atlasov Island.

== History ==
Between 1848 and 1874, American whaleships caught bowhead whales off the cape. They also went ashore to obtain wood.

== See also ==
- Cape Crillon
