= Khalpili Islands =

- Island group
- Location within Magadan Oblast
- Coordinates: 61.2650°N 159.7506°E
- Country: Russian Federation
- Federal subject: Far Eastern Federal District
- Oblast: Magadan Oblast

Khalpili Islands (Ostrova Khalpili) is an archipelago in the Sea of Okhotsk of the North Pacific region, in Northeast Asia.

== Geography ==
The group consists of two main islets and several smaller islets and rocks. Administratively the islands are within the Magadan Oblast of the Far Eastern Federal District, Russia.

== See also ==
- Islands of the Sea of Okhotsk
- Islands of the Russian Far East
