= 2025 Istanbul earthquake =

Strong earthquake near Istanbul, Turkey

- USGS ShakeMap
- Location within Turkey
- UTC time: 2025-04-23 09:49:10
- ISC event: 643165028
- USGS-ANSS: ComCat
- Local date: 23 April 2025
- Local time: 12:49:10 TRT (UTC+3)
- Duration: 13 seconds
- Magnitude: M_{w} 6.2
- Depth: 12.7 km (7.9 mi)
- Epicenter: 40.840°N 28.142°E
- Fault: North Anatolian Fault
- Type: Strike-slip
- Areas affected: Istanbul, Sakarya, Tekirdağ, Kocaeli, Bursa and Yalova Provinces, Turkey
- Max. intensity: MMI VIII (Severe)
- Tsunami: 6 cm (2.4 in)
- Aftershocks: 400+ recorded Strongest: mb5.0
- Casualties: 1 death (indirect), 359 injuries

On 23 April 2025 at 12:49:10 TRT, a M_{ww} 6.2 earthquake struck the Sea of Marmara, 24 km (15 mi) southeast of Marmara Ereğlisi, Tekirdağ Province, Turkey, near Istanbul. One person died of a heart attack, 359 others were injured, and moderate damage was recorded across the Marmara region.

== Tectonic setting ==
Istanbul lies close to the western end of the North Anatolian Fault Zone (NAFZ), which is a 1,200 km (750 mi) right-lateral strike-slip fault zone, forming the northern boundary of the Anatolian plate. The Anatolian plate is being forced westwards relative to the Eurasian plate by the northward movement of the Arabian plate. It extends from the Gulf of Saros in the west to Karlıova in the east. The western end of the fault zone consists of two main strands, the northern of which runs through the Sea of Marmara. It began to form around 13–11 million years ago in the eastern part of Anatolia, propagating gradually westwards. The fault eventually reached the Sea of Marmara around 200,000 years ago. Before the discrete fault strands developed at the western end, the area was affected by diffuse shear-related movement in a rather broad zone, dating back to the late Miocene.

The last powerful earthquakes to strike the NAFZ occurred in 1999, them being the İzmit and Düzce events which struck on 17 August and 12 November, respectively. In November 2022, a M_{w} 6.1 event struck west of Düzce.

Many seismologists agree that there is a 64% chance for a M_{w}7.0 or higher earthquake near Istanbul before 2030, likely to be caused by the breaking of the NAFZ beneath the Marmara Sea.

== Earthquake ==
The United States Geological Survey (USGS) reported a magnitude of M_{ww} 6.2. Its offshore epicenter was located in the Sea of Marmara, 21 km (13 mi) southeast of Marmara Ereğlisi in Tekirdağ Province, or 73 km (45 mi) southwest of Istanbul. Shaking lasted 13 seconds. It was the most powerful earthquake to hit Turkey since the 2023 Turkey–Syria earthquakes, the biggest one to strike the North Anatolian Fault since the 1999 Düzce earthquake, and the most powerful in the Sea of Marmara region since the 1999 İzmit earthquake.

The earthquake had a maximum Modified Mercalli intensity of VIII (Severe). According to the USGS' PAGER service, an estimated 56,000 people were exposed to this level of shaking, mostly in parts of Çorlu. An additional 796,000 were exposed to MMI VII (Very Strong) shaking, mostly in Esenyurt and Büyükçekmece municipalities in Istanbul; MMI VI (Strong) was felt by about 3.4 million people, much of them in western areas of Istanbul Province, while Istanbul's city center recorded MMI V (Moderate) shaking. MMI IV (Light) was also recorded in Bursa, as well as Evros in Greece and the cities of Burgas and Yambol in Bulgaria. In addition, people reported shaking in areas as far away as Gaziantep, Bucharest in Romania and Sofia in Bulgaria. By 25 April 260 aftershocks were recorded, including a mb5.0 and a M_{ww}4.9 event at 13:02 and 15:12, respectively. The earthquake also triggered a small tsunami, with maximum heights of 6 cm (2.4 in) at Erdek, 4 cm (1.6 in) at Esenköy and 3 cm (1.2 in) at Silivri.

== Impact ==
An Uzbek national died of a heart attack and at least 359 people were injured due to widespread panic, including 236 in Istanbul, 40 in Sakarya, 28 in Tekirdağ, 23 in Kocaeli, 21 in Yalova and 11 in Bursa. At least 4,295 buildings were damaged and some mobile network providers were disrupted in parts of Istanbul, with 80% of the damage occurring on the European side of the city; 539 buildings suffered damage in Esenyurt. In Fatih, an abandoned three-storey building collapsed. A four-storey building also suffered damage in Silivri, the roof of a building fell at Büyükçekmece and a three-storey building partially collapsed in Bakırköy. In addition, there were 61 damaged buildings in Tekirdağ, 28 each in Kocaeli and Bursa, and three in Yalova.

== Response ==
At least 3,597 personnel were deployed to the Marmara region, including 1,443 in Istanbul, along with 250 vehicles and 18 rescue dogs. Education Minister Yusuf Tekin announced the closure of schools from 24 to 25 April in Istanbul and Tekirdağ. Parks in Fatih and several mosques, including the Şehzade Mosque, were converted to overnight shelters. Interior Minister Ali Yerlikaya said that 100,000 people slept in designated shelters overnight due to the earthquake.

The Yemeni embassy in Ankara urged Yemeni nationals in Istanbul to remain calm and vigilant while following instructions from authorities.

== See also ==
- List of earthquakes in Turkey
- List of earthquakes in 2025
- 1766 Istanbul earthquake
- 1766 Marmara earthquake
- 1894 Istanbul earthquake
- 2019 Istanbul earthquake
- 2023 Turkey–Syria earthquakes
