= 1999 Turkey earthquake =

The 1999 Turkey earthquake may refer to:

- 1999 İzmit earthquake, 7.6 magnitude quake on August 17
- 1999 Düzce earthquake, 7.2 magnitude quake on November 12, 60 miles further east

== See also ==
- List of earthquakes in Turkey
