= Istanbul earthquake =

Istanbul earthquake may refer to:

- 1766 Istanbul earthquake
- 1894 Istanbul earthquake
- 2019 Istanbul earthquake
- 2025 Istanbul earthquake
