= 2019 Istanbul earthquake =

Earthquake in Turkey

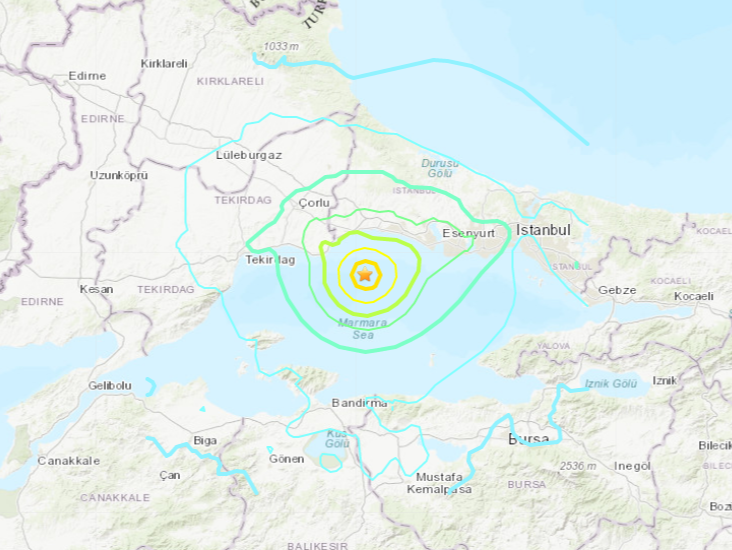
- UTC time: 2019-09-26 10:59:26
- ISC event: 616505180
- USGS-ANSS: ComCat
- Local date: 26 September 2019
- Local time: 13:59:26
- Magnitude: 5.7 M_{w} 5.8 M_{L}
- Depth: 8 km (5.0 mi)
- Epicenter: 40.890°N 28.173°E
- Fault: North Anatolian Fault, near Marmaraereğlisi and Silivri
- Type: Strike-slip
- Areas affected: Istanbul, Turkey
- Max. intensity: MMI VI (Strong)
- Casualties: 1 dead (indirect), 43 injured Damage in 473 buildings

2019 Istanbul earthquake was a 5.8 magnitude earthquake that rocked the south-west of Istanbul on 26 September 2019 at 13:59 local time.

One person died due to a heart attack and 43 people were injured. The earthquake was felt in Istanbul, Tekirdağ, Kırklareli, Kocaeli and Sakarya.

== Background ==
North Anatolian Fault system is a strike-slip fault system located in the northern side of Anatolian Plate, which lies between relatively stationary Eurasian Plate in the north and the Arabian Plate in the south. Approximately 1500 km in length, the North Anatolian fault system passes about 20 kilometers south of Istanbul. Strong earthquakes occur at certain intervals along the fault.

The last large earthquakes in the fault system happened in 1999. On 17 August the earthquake in İzmit (7.4 M_{w}) killed 17.480 people. On 12 November, another earthquake in the nearby city of Düzce (7.2 M_{w}) killed 845 and injured 4.948.

Many seismologist agree that there is a very high chance for a 7 or higher magnitude earthquake before 2030; which will be caused by the breaking of the North Anatolian fault line under Marmara Sea, just south of Istanbul.

== Earthquake ==
Three days before the main earthquake, on 23 September, there was a 4.6-degree shock in the south-west of Istanbul. Two hours before the earthquake, at 12:00 noon, a 2.9 earthquake took place in Silivri.

The earthquake happened at 13:59 local time at the western edge of the Kumburgaz section of North Anatolian Fault under the Sea of Marmara, at a depth of 6.99 km as a strike-slip movement. Different sources states the magnitude as 5.7 M_{w} and 5.8 ML.

Over 300 aftershocks were reported after the main earthquake.

== Damage ==
Schools and hospitals were evacuated after the earthquake. Governor of Istanbul Ali Yerlikaya announced the schools were closed for the day. AFAD suggested not to enter to the damaged buildings. A 4.1 magnitude aftershock was reported 25 minutes after the main shock.

The first announcement by the President Recep Tayyip Erdoğan stated 8 injured. Later announcements stated a total of 43 injured mostly from panic, and one person with known heart illness dead due to a heart attack.

188 aftershocks with maximum magnitude of 4.1 were recorded after the earthquake. A total of 473 buildings were reported as damaged to AFAD.

A minaret of Avcılar Hacı Ahmet Tükenmez mosque collapsed. Three protected old buildings were damaged in Balat, and later demolished by the municipality later in the day. Take-offs and landings to Sabiha Gökçen Airport were temporarily halted, but flight operations resumed after the runway was checked for potential damage and deemed safe.

AFAD reported damage to walls of the city near İstanbul Biruni University, cracks in some buildings in some neighborhoods, damage in two buildings in Sultangazi and Eyüp, and evacuation of a building in Şirinevler.

Mobile phone coverage of Türk Telekom, Turkcell, and Vodafone were interrupted nationwide for some time after the earthquake, while mobile internet services and landlines were not affected.

== See also ==
- 1894 Istanbul earthquake
- 1999 Izmit earthquake
- 2025 Istanbul earthquake
- List of earthquakes in 2019
- List of earthquakes in Turkey
