= Erzincan earthquake =

Erzincan earthquake may refer to:

- 1939 Erzincan earthquake
- 1992 Erzincan earthquake

== See also ==
- List of earthquakes in Turkey
