= 1598 Amasya–Çorum earthquake =

Earthquake and tsunami affecting Turkey

1598 Amasya–Corum earthquake
- Location within Turkey
- Local date: May 1598
- Magnitude: 6.7 M_{s}
- Epicenter: 40.6°N 35.4°E
- Areas affected: present-day Turkey
- Max. intensity: MMI VIII (Severe)
- Tsunami: 1 m (3 ft 3 in)
- Casualties: 60,000 killed

The 1598 Amasya–Çorum earthquake devastated central north Anatolia during the month of May. The earthquake destroyed the towns of Amasya and Çorum, killing at least 60,000 people. A tsunami accompanied the shock, drowning many people along the Black Sea coast of present-day Turkey. Several thousand people drowned when the tsunami advanced towards coastal towns and villages. The tsunami inundated up to one mile inland. In the gulf between Sinop and Samsun, the tsunami had a wave height of 1 m (3 ft 3 in). The tsunami is thought to be the result of a submarine landslide. Little is known about the earthquake damage due to sparse historical records; the full extent of destruction is not known. It is thought to have been the result of rupture along the North Anatolian Fault but the specific segments which were involved could not be identified due to limited information. It is unlikely there was surface rupturing involved. The surface wave magnitude (M_{s}) and rupture length were estimated at 6.7 and 22 km (14 mi), respectively.

== See also ==
- List of historical earthquakes
- List of earthquakes in Turkey
