= 1899 Aydın–Denizli earthquake =

Earthquake in Turkey

- Location within Turkey
- Local date: 20 September 1899
- Local time: 04:00
- Magnitude: 6.5–7.1 M_{w}
- Epicenter: 37.9°N 28.1°E
- Areas affected: Ottoman Empire
- Max. intensity: MMI IX (Violent)
- Casualties: 1,117–1,470 fatalities, "hundreds" injured

The 1899 Aydın–Denizli earthquake which struck present-day Turkey on September 20 resulted in between 1,117 and 1,470 fatalities. Heavy damage was reported in the provinces of Aydın and Denizli. The shallow normal-faulting earthquake had a maximum Modified Mercalli intensity of IX (Violent). Estimates of the seismic magnitude range from 6.5 to 7.1 M_{w}.

== Tectonic setting ==
A plate tectonics map of Western Turkey

Turkey is located in a geologically active area of the Anatolian Plate where neighbouring plates interact along boundaries, including the North Anatolian Fault, East Anatolian Fault and Hellenic subduction zone. The northward progression of the Arabian Plate towards the Anatolian Plate, and subduction of oceanic crust beneath the Anatolian Plate results in internal crustal deformation. Intraplate strike-slip faults within the Anatolian Plate accommodate this crustal deformation, together with faulting along the North Anatolian and East Anatolian faults. Western Turkey is located in a region of active extension (the West Anatolian Extensional Province). This zone of north–south extension is the result of oceanic crust subducting offshore. Active normal faults accommodate the extension deformation, forming east–west trending horst and graben features.

== Earthquake ==
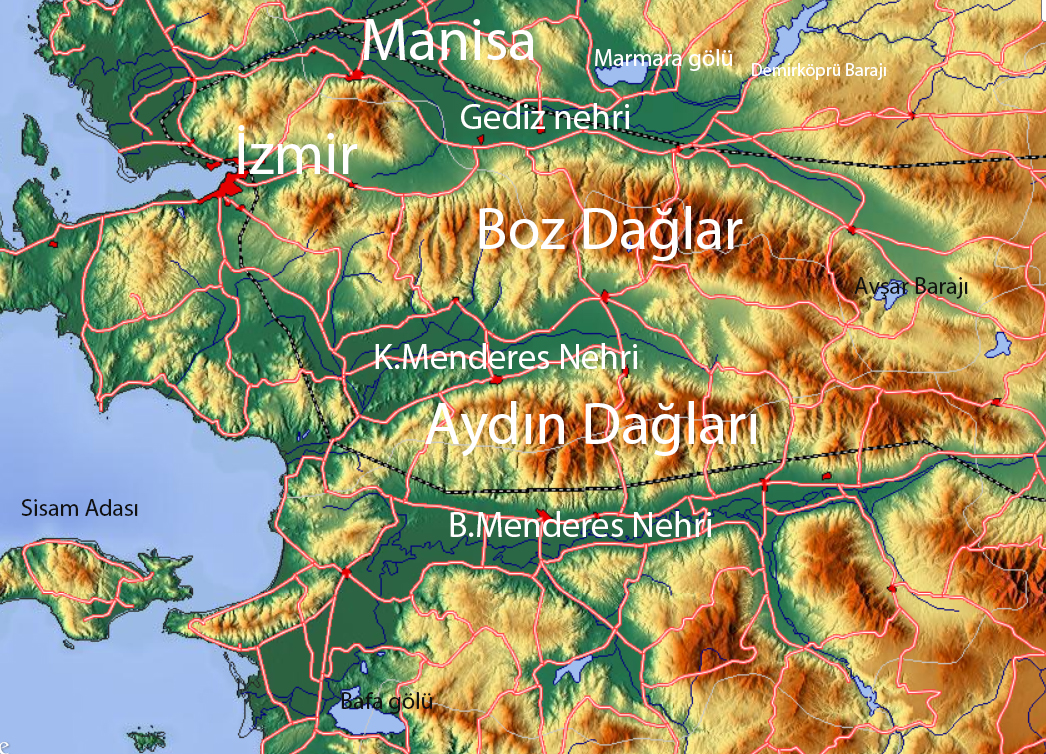
Büyük Menderes Graben

The 1899 earthquake was the result of rupturing an active normal fault in the West Anatolian Extensional Province. The fault responsible for the earthquake was a south-dipping, low-angle structure which also formed the Büyük Menderes Graben. It represented the northern boundary of the graben. The rupture is thought to have initiated 4–5 km (2.5–3.1 mi) beneath the surface. Earthquakes in the Denizli area are frequent, with at least eight historically damaging events recorded since 60 CE.

A 50 km (31 mi) long surface rupture and up to 3 m (9.8 ft) of vertical displacement was measured during geological fieldworks in the 1960s and 1970s. Near Sarayköy, an offset of 2 m (6 ft 7 in) was measured. The rupture also produced a 50 cm (20 in) right-lateral strike-slip component. In 1998, Nicholas Ambraseys measured the surface rupture length to be 70 km (43 mi). A 2013 study of damage and aid distribution reports led to the interpretation that the earthquake may have in fact been two mainshocks occurring in close succession of each other. The latter mainshock had an estimated magnitude of 6.7.

== Aftermath ==
The area within the Büyük Menderes Graben was extensively damaged, with the cities of Sultanhisar, Atca, Nazilli, Kuyucak, Sarayköy, Denizli and Karacasu experiencing the greatest destruction. A total of 12,932 homes were destroyed, including 350 in Aydın; 2,052 in Köşk, Sultanhisar, Atça and Nazilli; 2,931 in Kuyucak and Ortakçı; and 720 in Sarayköy. In addition, 8,756 more were damaged. The earthquake and its secondary effects killed 1,117–1,470 people and left 80,000–100,000 homeless.

An estimated 55 percent of all homes in Denizli were razed. The older part of Nazilli was completely destroyed; a liquorice factory and all public infrastructures were decimated. In the newer part of town, half the home stock was left in ruins, further exacerbated by a conflagration. Fires also destroyed the homes of Saraykoy, including those that survived the shock. Several hundred homes and the minarets of a mosque collapsed in Aydin. A factory chimney, and some churches and synagogues also toppled. On the stretch of railroad from Aydin to Cal and Denizli, parts of the earthwork slumped, causing the rails to be suspended 2 m (6 ft 7 in) in the air. Railway bridges were damaged at three towns located near Sarayköy. Collapsed telecommunication poles were reported east of Kuyucak and Gemelli. Landslides buried an abandoned town and damage two more. Soil liquefaction was reported in Kogarli, Sahinli and Cellat.

== Response ==
News of the disaster reached the government of the Ottoman Empire in Istanbul, and a crisis management was established. Multiple relief campaigns were started by various religious and ethnic groups in Istanbul and İzmir. Damaged telecommunication systems disrupted the distribution of aid in the first few days after the earthquake. Aid distribution was highly disorganized but carried on smoothly when official establishments in Aydın, Istanbul and İzmir were involved. The Ottoman government helped construct 5,598 homes and repaired 11,975 others.

== See also ==
- List of historical earthquakes
- List of earthquakes in Turkey
