= 1883 Çeşme earthquake =

Earthquake in Turkey

- Location within Greece
- UTC time: 12:30
- Local date: 15 October 1883
- Local time: 15:30
- Duration: 15 seconds
- Magnitude: 6.8 M_{w}
- Epicenter: 38.30°N 26.43°E
- Areas affected: Chios, Urla, Çeşme and surrounding areas
- Max. intensity: MMI IX (Violent)
- Casualties: 53–120 dead, 200+ injured

The 1883 Çeşme earthquake occurred at 12:30 local time on October 15. This earthquake shook a wide area and was felt in the neighboring islands as well as in modern-day Western Turkey. It had a magnitude of 6.8 on the moment magnitude scale and a maximum felt intensity of IX (Violent) on the Mercalli intensity scale. Many homes in small towns between Çeşme and Urla were destroyed and, according to various sources, 53 to 90 people were killed. This was the biggest earthquake ever experienced by Çeşme in its history. The aftershocks of this quake, like the previous event 2 years before, lasted for a long period, continuing for around 5 more months.

== Tectonic setting ==
The Aegean Sea region is one of the most seismically active areas in the Alpide Belt. The northern boundary of the Aegean Sea plate is the western portion of the North Anatolian Fault Zone and in the south there is a convergent boundary with the African plate, which is being subducted below the Aegean Sea plate along the Hellenic subduction zone.

The Chios Island-Karaburun region is one of the most seismically active parts of the Aegean area. The region has a complex geographical profile and is surrounded by uneven bays and seas. Rapid changes in tectonic patterns occur due to the relative motions of the surrounding tectonic plates. The mountains and faults in the area are mostly directed NE-SW and N-S. This event, similar to the fault directions, ruptured in a N–S direction.

== Impact ==
Structural impact near the epicenter was high however, despite the high magnitude and intensity, there were few casualties.

=== Damage ===
Following the strong shaking, more than 3,000 homes collapsed, most of them being in the epicentral area and more than 17,000 people were left homeless. Tens of villages were almost completely flattened, with 14 of them left uninhabitable.

=== Casualties ===
According to an Ottoman padishah representative who was deployed in the area, the casualty figures are 59 dead and 209 injured, however other sources had deaths ranging in between 53 and 90. Other articles made after the earthquake note the death count as 120 or more.

== Response ==
The Ottoman Government and local governments' response to the earthquake and damage was considered successful. A large amount of food and materials for barracks were donated. Charities that were hosted managed to collect up to 224,183 kuruş. Government and army officials were allocated to the most damaged towns and villages. Following the arrival of helping officials or groups, 710 tents were set up for the people who survived. However, later on, as there were too many left without homes to settle into tents, several barracks were built in 20 to 25 days and the housing issues for the homeless were mostly solved. The victims' problems with residing and basic needs were solved as quickly and efficiently possible for them to return to their normal and daily lives with no major issues. The emperor at the time, Abdul Hamid II visited the destroyed villages and victims and made a speech of motivation. Kermises were hosted with the 2,500 Ottoman liras that Abdulhamid donated. He also paid 3 more visits in the following months.

== See also ==
- 1881 Chios earthquake
- List of earthquakes in Turkey
