= 1967 Mudurnu earthquake =

Earthquake in western Turkey

- Location within Turkey
- UTC time: 1967-07-22 16:57:00
- ISC event: 833573
- USGS-ANSS: ComCat
- Local date: 22 July 1967
- Local time: 18:57
- Magnitude: 7.4 M_{w} 7.1 M_{s}
- Depth: 33.0 km
- Epicenter: 40.67°N 30.69°E
- Type: Oblique slip
- Areas affected: Turkey
- Max. intensity: MMI X (Extreme)
- Casualties: 86 dead

The 1967 Mudurnu earthquake or more correctly, the 1967 Mudurnu Valley earthquake occurred at about 18:57 local time on 22 July near Mudurnu, Bolu Province, north-western Turkey. The magnitude 7.4 M_{w} earthquake (but only 6.0 on the mb scale.) was one of a series of major and intermediate quakes that have occurred in modern times along the North Anatolian Fault since 1939.

== Earthquake ==
Although the Mudurnu Valley earthquake was relatively strong, there were only 86 fatalities, with 332 people injured. About 5,200 houses were destroyed or damaged beyond repair; some 900 of these were in Adapazarı at the far western end of the fault zone, and many collapsed completely as a result of aftershocks.

=== Intensity ===
The authors of the 1968 UNESCO report into the Mudurnu Valley earthquake, with Nicholas Ambraseys as its first author, felt that its Mercalli intensity was difficult to estimate accurately. In some places an implied level of XII (Extreme) was evident, whereas the vibrational effects were nearer VIII–IX (Severe–Violent). Although a large number of sites were independently assessed by up to six observers, variations of up to four degrees of the Mercalli scale indicated that an accurate figure was practically impossible to gauge. A 1988 paper authored by Ambraseys lists the event with a maximum Mercalli intensity of X (Extreme).

=== Damage ===
Considering the large surface-wave magnitude (7.1) and widespread surface rupturing, structural damage to buildings was surprisingly small; variations in damage were related to the materials used and construction method of individual buildings, rather than the proximity to the fault break. Some villages suffered 70% destruction of property, while others nearby with fault lines running right through them had only a few houses damaged.

=== Surface rupture ===
The surface rupture zone, which was between 1–4 kilometres (0.62–2.49 mi) wide, stretched some 80 km (50 mi) from to Lake Abant (Turkish: Abant Gölü) to Sapanca in an East–West direction, generally following the course of the Mudurnu River until it flows north near Lake Sapanca. The earthquake is named after the river valley, not the town of Mudurnu itself, which is some distance south of the river and outside the rupture zone.

=== Aftershocks ===
A number of small aftershocks occurred, mostly towards the westward end of the fault zone; its eastern end overlapped the rupture zone of the previous M7.1 1957 Abant earthquake with a similar epicentre, by about 25 km (16 mi).

== See also ==
- List of earthquakes in 1967
- List of earthquakes in Turkey

== Sources ==
- Ambraseys, N.N.; Zápotek, A.; Taşdemiroğlu, M.; Aytun, M. (1968), The Mudurnu Valley (West Anatolia) Earthquake of 22 July 1967 (PDF), UNESCO.
- ANSS, "Mudurnu 1967", Comprehensive Catalog, U.S. Geological Survey
- International Seismological Centre, ISC-EHB Bulletin, Thatcham, United Kingdom
- Toksöz, M.N.; Shakal, A.F.; Michael, A.J. (1979), "Space-time migration of earthquakes along the North Anatolian fault zone and seismic gaps", Pure and Applied Geophysics, 117 (6), Birkhäuser Geoscience: 1258–1270, Bibcode:1979PApGe.117.1258T, doi:10.1007/BF00876218, S2CID 186224522.
