= 1898 Balıkesir earthquake =

Earthquake in Turkey

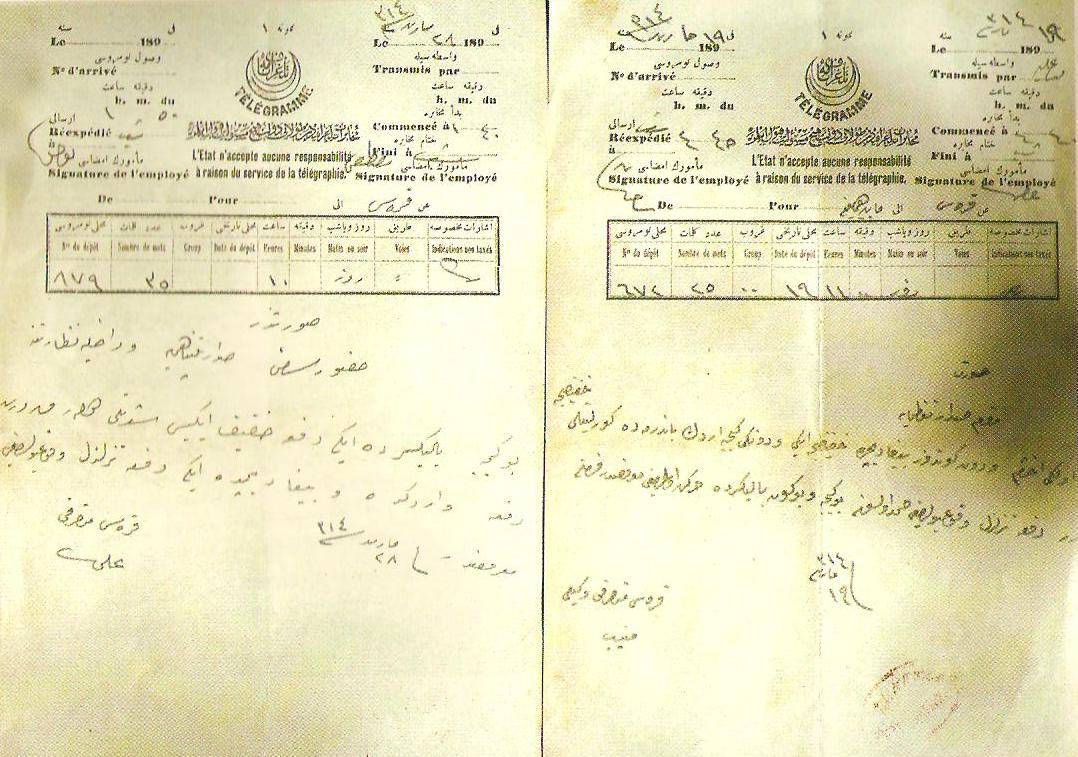
- An Ottoman official telegraph reporting the earthquake.

- Location within Turkey
- UTC time: 1898-01-29 08:30
- Local date: 29 January 1898
- Local time: 11:30 TRT (UTC+3:00)
- Magnitude: 7.0 M_{w}
- Epicenter: Balıkesir; 39.40°N 27.53°E
- Areas affected: Ottoman Empire
- Casualties: 500 fatalities

The 1898 Balıkesir earthquake occurred around 11:30 local time (8:30 UTC) on 29 January 1898 in Ottoman Empire, modern Turkey. It was the deadliest earthquake in history of Balıkesir. Around 500 people died as a result of the earthquake. Only 51 of the 11,000 buildings in city remained unaffected. Around 53,000 people from the city and around the city were affected.
