= Büyük Menderes Graben =

The Büyük Menderes Graben is an active rift basin in western Turkey, part of the Western Anatolian Extension Zone. It is about 140 km long and 2.5–14 km wide with a west–east trend. It was formed during the early Miocene and remains active, as shown by historical earthquakes, the largest of which was the M7.5 1653 East Smyrna earthquake. Another event, the 1899 Aydın–Denizli earthquake, also occurred on a fault associated with the graben. The graben forms a rift valley, through which the Büyük Menderes River drains into the Aegean Sea.
