= 1964 Manyas earthquake =

Earthquake in Turkey

- Location within Marmara Location within Turkey
- UTC time: 1964-10-06 14:31:25
- ISC event: 863310
- USGS-ANSS: ComCat
- Local date: October 6, 1964
- Local time: 16:31:25
- Magnitude: 6.8 M_{w}
- Depth: 27.4 km (17.0 mi)
- Epicenter: 40.2°N 28.21°E
- Areas affected: Turkey
- Total damage: $5 million
- Max. intensity: MMI IX (Violent)
- Casualties: 19–73 killed, 100–239 injured

The 1964 Manyas earthquake happened on October 6 on the southern coast of Marmara Sea near the city of Karacabey in Bursa Province, Turkey. The shock had a moment magnitude of 6.8 and a maximum Mercalli intensity of IX (Violent). Around $5 million in damage was caused, with 19–73 killed and 100–239 injured.

== See also ==
- List of earthquakes in 1964
- List of earthquakes in Turkey
