= 1859 Erzurum earthquake =

Earthquake in Turkey

- Location within Turkey
- Local date: 2 June 1859
- Magnitude: 6.1 M_{uk}
- Epicenter: 39.90°N 41.30°E
- Areas affected: Turkey
- Max. intensity: MMI IX (Violent)
- Casualties: 15,000

The 1859 Erzurum earthquake occurred at 10:30 on 2 June. It had a magnitude of 6.1 and a maximum intensity of IX on the Mercalli intensity scale, causing 15,000 casualties. The earthquake destroyed much of the city of Erzurum.

== Impact ==
The 2 June 1859 earthquake and its powerful aftershock fifteen minutes later reduced much of Erzurum to rubble. Ottoman records report that 1462 houses and 867 shops were completely destroyed, and over 1200 dwellings rendered uninhabitable; 26 mosques, 60 madrasas and schools, and 62 caravanserais and baths suffered partial or total collapse. Contemporary sources record approximately 920 fatalities—600 in the main shocks and a further 320–330 from building collapses in the immediate aftermath—among them 72 men, 80 women and around 171 children; military losses included seven soldiers killed and nine wounded. Aftershocks persisted through July, the strongest on 15 July 1859 causing additional structural damage but no confirmed further casualties.

== Aftermath ==
Reconstruction and relief efforts began immediately. Sultan Abdülmecid authorised an emergency grant of 3000 kese akçe (3000 purses' worth of silver coin—on the order of 120 million to 150 million akçe), and Governor Arif Pasha appealed to the Porte for further assistance. Neighbouring Trabzon Province raised over 100,000 kuruş in aid, of which 23,728 kuruş was dispatched to Erzurum; the remainder helped needy Nogay migrants en route to the city. Shortages of tents and the summer heat forced many survivors to camp outdoors. Damage to aqueduct and springs also threatened public health by contaminating water supplies.

== See also ==
- List of earthquakes in Turkey
- List of historical earthquakes
