= National Disaster Insurance Institution =

Government agency in Turkey

- Doğal Afet Sigortaları Kurumu
- Abbreviation: DASK
- Formation: December 27, 1999; 26 years ago
- Headquarters: Ankara, Turkey
- Website: DASK website

The National Disaster Insurance Institution (Turkish: Doğal Afet Sigortaları Kurumu, DASK) is a government institution in Turkey, which was founded for managing and applying compulsory earthquake insurance.

After 1999 İzmit earthquake, the awareness against earthquakes was heightened on Turkish public opinion and bureaucracy. As a part of the preparations against another major earthquake, compulsory insurance was also on agenda. DASK was founded on 27 December 1999 by "The Decree-law About Compulsory Earthquake Insurance, numbered 587" as the Turkish Catastrophe Insurance Pool (TCIP). The pool produced its first insurance policy on 27 September 2000. DASK is still selling its policies through 24 different insurance companies and their agencies.

The pool was managed by the Millî Reasürans, a subsidiary of İşbank, for five years. DASK is currently managed by Türk Reasürans company, wholly owned by the Ministry of Treasury and Finance.

The institution is making payments for the 2023 Turkey–Syria earthquake.
