= 1766 Marmara earthquake =

Earthquake with epicenter in the western part of the Sea of Marmara

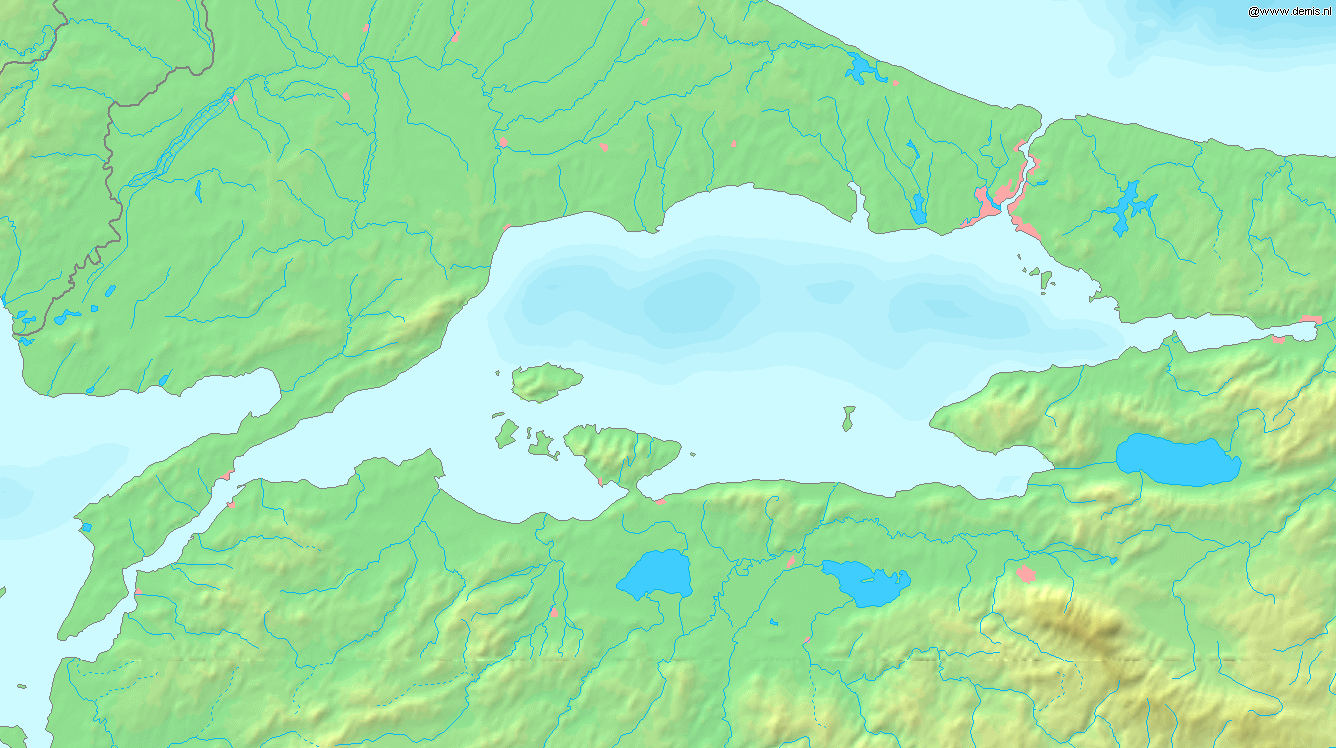
- Location within Sea of Marmara
- Local date: 5 August 1766
- Magnitude: 7.4–7.6 M_{w}
- Epicenter: 40.6°N 27°E
- Fault: North Anatolian Fault
- Areas affected: Ottoman Empire
- Max. intensity: MMI X (Extreme)
- Tsunami: None
- Casualties: >5,000 fatalities

The 1766 Marmara earthquake occurred on 5 August; the second major earthquake to strike the Sea of Marmara region of present-day Turkey that same year. Estimates of the earthquake's moment magnitude (M_{w}) range between 7.4 and 7.6. The earthquake was caused by strike-slip movement along a segment of the North Anatolian Fault. There was further damage and casualties in the Sea of Marmara area which had been affected by another major earthquake in May 1766. The worst affected areas were Tekirdağ and Gelibolu.

== Tectonic setting ==
The Sea of Marmara represents a pull-apart basin in a zone of complex strike-slip tectonic interactions associated with the North Anatolian Fault. The North Anatolian Fault is a predominantly right-lateral strike-slip fault that extends from Karliova to the Gulf of İzmit. West of the gulf, the fault splits into three branches; the northernmost strand plunges into the gulf and into the Sea of Marmara. The 230 km (140 mi) by 70 km (43 mi) basin itself hosts smaller pull-apart basins; the Tekirdağ, Central, Çınarcık, Karamürsel, and İzmit basins. These basins are bounded by short strike-slip and normal faults suggesting significant extensional tectonics in the area. Further west of the Sea of Marmara is the strike-slip Saros (Ganos) Fault which continues west into the North Aegean Sea.

The Ganos Fault is an east-northeast–west-southwest trending structure that represents the westernmost segment of the North Anatolian Fault. Its central part runs onshore between Gaziköy and Saros. Geologic studies indicate a total offset of 100–600 m (330–1,970 ft) was accumulated along this segment. Continuing west, the fault runs underwater in the North Aegean Sea through the Gulf of Saros for at least 40 km (25 mi). Its eastern length lies under the Sea of Marmara, trending east–west, into the central basin where it terminates at a restraining bend. The most recent earthquakes on the Ganos Fault occurred on 9 August 1912 (M_{w} 7.4) and 13 September 1912 (M_{w} 6.8). Both earthquakes ruptured the Ganos Fault for an estimated length of 150 ± 30 km (93 ± 19 mi).

== Earthquake ==
Estimates of the moment magnitude (M_{w}) range between 7.4 and 7.6 and the epicenter location was suggested to be at 40.6°N 27°E. The same region was affected by a surface-wave magnitude (M_{s}) 7.3 earthquake on 9 August 1912. Both earthquakes ruptured the Ganos Fault along Gallipoli. The 1912 event released seismic strain which had been accumulating in the 146 years since the 1766 event. Meanwhile, the 22 May 1766 earthquake was associated with rupture on the Prince's Islands Segment. Geologic trenching along the North Anatolian Fault where it plunges into the Gulf of Saros indicate evidence of rupture associated with this event. In the northwestern Sea of Marmara, fresh surface ruptures in the basin floor revealing offsets of 5 m (16 ft) were associated with the 1912 event but older scarps could be associated with the 1766 event. Estimates of the August 1766 earthquake rupture length range from 50 km (31 mi) to 140 km (87 mi). The 1754, May 1766 and August 1766 earthquakes were part of a westward-propagating series of earthquakes along the Sea of Marmara section of the fault.

== Impact ==
There were more than 5,000 deaths associated with the mainshock. This earthquake "completed the destruction" caused by another earthquake on 22 May 1766. It broadened the earthquake-damage area further west of Rodosto. Destruction occurred in the area between Silivri and Tenedos with fatalities. Ganohora District in Tekirdağ was completely razed and there was heavy damage in Gelibolu. Many castles located within an area extending from the Dardanelles Strait to Evreşe were affected. Damage was reported in Bursa, Thrace, Edirne and Biga. At Istanbul, damage was slight.

The observed maximum Modified Mercalli intensity (MMI) was X (Extreme) at Hoşköy (Hora). MMI IX (Violent) was observed at Gülcük, Gelibolu, Gaziköy, Mürefte, Sarkoy, Tekirdag and Evrese. The towns of Bozcaada, Çanakkale, Kilidbahir, Malkara, Seddulbahir, Mudanya and Seddulbahir was assigned MMI VIII (Severe). Ninety percent of all homes in Ganos and half of the settlements in Gelibolu were decimated. Ground fractures and liquefactions occurred at Gelibolu. All villages that lie along the onshore segment of the Ganos Fault were ruined.

The earthquake's felt area extended as far as Athos, Thessaloniki, Aydın and İzmir. It was also felt across the Balkan Peninsula and in the Carpathian Mountains. A damaging aftershock sequence continued for a year. On 29 May 1776, another earthquake struck the Sea of Marmara region; many buildings damaged by the 1766 earthquakes were damaged again. Damage from this shock was widespread but minor.

== See also ==
- List of historical earthquakes
- List of earthquakes in Turkey
