= 1063 Marmara earthquake =

- Location within Marmara
- Local date: 23 September 1063
- Local time: At night
- Magnitude: 7.15 M_{w}
- Epicenter: 40.867°N 27.411°E
- Fault: North Anatolian Fault
- Areas affected: Byzantine Empire
- Max. intensity: MMI IX (Violent)
- Casualties: Many people

The northern coast of the Sea of Marmara was struck by a major earthquake on 23 September 1063. It caused serious damage to the towns of Panion (Barbaros), Myriophyton (Mürefte) and Rhaedestus (Tekirdag). Significant damage was also reported from Constantinople, further east along the northern coast, and at Cyzicus (Erdek) on the southern coast. It had an estimated magnitude of 7.15 on the moment magnitude scale (M_{w}) and the shaking reached a maximum of IX (Violent) on the Modified Mercalli intensity scale {MMI}. The earthquake was recorded by Michael Attaleiates, the Byzantine chronicler, who was living in Constantinople at the time.

== Tectonic setting ==
The Sea of Marmara lies at the western end of the North Anatolian Fault zone, which accommodates the relative westward movement of the Anatolian plate relative to the Eurasian plate. This motion is a result of the northward movement of the Arabian plate. The East Anatolian Fault splits into two main branches, each of which is further divided into several segments. The northern branch, which passes through the northern part of the Sea of Marmara before reappearing on land as the Ganos Fault, is divided into eight segments.

== Earthquake ==
The earthquake is reported to have occurred on 23 September 1063, during the night "towards the second watch" (early evening). Some sources put the year as 1064. The mainshock was followed quickly by another three strong shocks and a further 10–12 that same night. The AHEAD catalogue gives a magnitude of 7.15±0.31 M_{w}, based on the distribution of seismic intensities. CFTI5, the Online catalogue of strong earthquakes in Italy 461 BC to 1997 and Mediterranean area 760 BC to 1500, gives an estimated magnitude of 6.0, also from the distribution of intensities. Seismic intensities have been estimated from historical descriptions of earthquake damage, with IX (violent shaking) given for Panion, Myriophyton and Rhaedestus, VIII–IX for Constantinople and VIII for Cyzicus.

From the areas affected, it has been proposed that this earthquake ruptured either segments F7 and F8 on the northern branch of the NAF, or just segment F8. Tsunami deposits in the form of turbidite-homogenite units have been found in the Tekirdag basin, one of which is consistent with it being generated by the 1063 event.

== Damage ==
The coastal towns of Panion and Rhaedestus were severely damaged and Myriophyton was particularly badly affected, with many people killed. The Greek temple at Cyzicus was badly damaged. In Constantinople many houses were destroyed and with few left unharmed. Some chroniclers report damage associated with this event from Nicea (Iznik), including the collapse of the great church. However, Attaleiates attributes this to an earthquake in Nicea in 1065, which he describes as the end of the sequence of earthquakes that began in 1063, two years earlier.
