= 1992 Erzincan earthquake =

6.9-magnitude earthquake in eastern Turkey

- Location within Turkey
- UTC time: 1992-03-13 17:18:39
- ISC event: 299638
- USGS-ANSS: ComCat
- Local date: 13 March 1992
- Local time: 8:18:39 pm
- Duration: 6–7 seconds
- Magnitude: M_{s} 6.8–6.9; M_{w} 6.6–6.7 mb 6.2
- Depth: 20 km (12 mi)
- Epicenter: 39.71°N 39.6°E
- Fault: North Anatolian Fault
- Type: Strike-slip
- Areas affected: Erzincan, Turkey
- Total damage: $500 million – $1.5 billion (Note: In 1992 USD)
- Max. intensity: MMI IX (Violent); MSK-64 IX (Destructive)
- Peak acceleration: 0.5 g
- Tsunami: No
- Landslides: Yes
- Aftershocks: Thousands, largest was M_{s} 5.8
- Casualties: 498–950 dead 2,800 injured

An earthquake struck eastern Turkey near the city of Erzincan at 20:18:39 local time on 13 March 1992. The second major earthquake to hit Erzincan in half a century, it measured 6.6–6.7 on the moment magnitude scale (M_{w}). It was assigned a maximum Modified Mercalli intensity of IX (Violent) and EMS-98 intensity of IX (Destructive). The horizontal peak ground acceleration reached 0.5 g, which is near the 1 in 475 year maximum for the area. Two days after the mainshock, a large M_{s} 5.8 aftershock struck Pülümür, causing further damage. Faulting occurred on the North Anatolian Fault where multiple other M_{w} 8+ earthquakes have occurred.

Financial losses from the earthquake reached $500 million – $1.5 billion. Significant destruction occurred; Erzincan was devastated due to proximity to the epicenter. Damage was amplified due to systemic disregard for the building codes. Over 200 buildings collapsed, and over 15,000 were damaged. Infrastructure, however, remained mostly intact. 498-950 people died and roughly 2,800 were injured.

== Tectonic setting ==
Map of the Anatolian Plate, featuring the North Anatolian Fault.

Most of Turkey lies on the Anatolian Plate. Deformation from plate tectonics is accommodated through three main faults: the eastern portion of the Hellenic Trench accommodates convergence between the Aegean Sea plate and the Anatolian Plate in the south. The North Anatolian Fault in the north (along which this earthquake occurred) accommodates the deformation between the Anatolian Plate and the Eurasian plate which forces the Anatolian west, and the East Anatolian Fault in the east accommodates the same deformation.

The North Anatolian fault stretches for 1,500 km (930 mi) in an east–west orientation from the Aegean Sea to Karlıova. In the location of the earthquake, the North Anatolian fault currently slips dextrally at a rate of ~20 mm (0.79 in)/yr.

The Erzincan basin is 50 km (31 mi) by 15–25 km (9.3–15.5 mi) and lies at the intersection of the North Anatolian fault with the East Anatolian fault. It is a convoluted pull-apart basin formed by the North Anatolian Fault's interaction with the Ovacık and Northeast Anatolian faults, and is the largest North Anatolian Fault related basin.

Erzincan lies along the North Anatolian Fault, leading to the highest earthquake hazard in Turkey—comparable to that of the San Andreas Fault in California. In the past millennia, at least 17 earthquakes have struck the Erzincan area with an MSK of VIII (Damaging)) or higher. In the same time frame, at least 18 earthquakes of M_{w} 8 have struck the area. Notoriously, the M_{s} 7.8 1939 Erzincan earthquake struck the same area in 1939, which with an MMI of XII (Extreme) caused immense devastation.

== Earthquake ==
The earthquake struck at 17:18:39 on March 13, 1992. At 6.6–6.7 on the moment magnitude scale, the earthquake was designated as "strong". The shock also had recorded magnitudes of M_{s} 6.8–6.9 and mb 6.2. The maximum MSK-64 intensity was evaluated at IX (Destructive) and the maximum Modified Mercalli intensity was also IX (Violent). The earthquake had a recorded peak ground acceleration (maximum acceleration of the ground from an earthquake) of 0.5 g and peak ground velocity (maximum velocity of the ground from an earthquake) of 105 cm/s (41 in/s). This strong ground acceleration is near the highest expected to occur in the area every 475 years. The earthquake rupture lasted for 6–7 seconds, with strong ground motion in Erzincan lasting 20 seconds due to seismic wave propagation. Strong shaking was felt across the northeast of Turkey.

The partially blind earthquake (not reaching the surface) had a focal mechanism which indicated strike slip faulting, consistent with rupture on the North Anatolian Fault. The fault segment along which the mainshock occurred had a strike of 120–132 degrees with a dip between 72 and 90 degrees. Rupture propagated bilaterally along the fault, and in the southeast terminated where the fault meets the Ovacık fault. However, for modeling to match recorded seismic signals, two additional subevents are required, further to the southeast of the initial rupture. Rupture is estimated to be 30–50 km (19–31 mi) long with an average slip of 95–150 cm (37–59 in). Maximum slip was estimated to be 2.71 m (8.9 ft). The earthquake's average resultant stress drop (change in stress on a fault from an earthquake) was calculated to be 3.3 MPa, with a maximum drop of 9.7 MPa. Despite there being a seismic gap after the 1784 Erzincan earthquake near where the mainshock ruptured, the earthquake's rupture terminated near it rather than continuing through it. This may have been due to extensional tectonics not favoring rupture propagation in this direction. In the northwest, rupture terminated where the 1939 earthquake released a lot of strain. Therefore, the rupture was between the 1939 and 1784 earthquakes.

=== Aftershocks ===
More than 3,000 aftershocks rocked the area afterwards, including a M_{s} 5.8 strike slip and thrust faulting aftershock along the Pülümür fault that struck Pülümür two days after the mainshock. The Pülümür shock likely resulted from a localized increase in static stress of 1.4 bar as a result of the mainshock. A temporary group of 10 seismographs were set up in the area to monitor aftershocks. By a week after the mainshock, a majority of aftershocks were occurring at the southeastern end of the Erzincan Basin—not where the mainshock struck. Practically no aftershocks were recorded west of the mainshock rupture, despite faults in the area being optimally oriented. This is likely due to the much larger stress shadow (area where an earthquake has led to decreased stress that might look like a 'shadow' on a map of seismicity) from the 1939 earthquake relaxing this area so much that the increase in stress from the mainshock did not bring faults here to failure. As time passed after the mainshock, the area of which aftershocks occurred increased in size. This may have been a result of Coulomb stress transfer from the mainshock.

== Impact ==
The earthquake left 498–950 people killed and 2,800 injured. It collapsed over 200 buildings, including the three largest hotels, and left all three hospitals in Erzincan out of service. The earthquake damaged over 11,000 homes, with 2,200 heavily damaged in Erzincan alone. Over 15,000 buildings were damaged total. 16,000–17,000 people became homeless as a result of the earthquake. Destruction was made worse by the very poor adherence to the already weak local building codes and lax enforcement of the regulations. Additionally, the alluvial soil that the city was built upon amplified the seismic waves, further increasing damage. The Ankara–Kars railway suffered some damage, but maintained continuous train service. A big portion of Erzincan was cut off from the water supply due to water pipe damage and a lack of redundancy. Telecommunication infrastructure was briefly offline until a portable relay truck brought it back up. A small fire broke out, but no major damage came of it. Power infrastructure was mostly untouched with the exception of the main transformer station. It suffered minor damage and remained operational. Damages caused by the earthquake were estimated as at least $500 million, with estimates up to $1.5 billion. Due to the earthquake, the Erzincan Basin shifted 1 m (3 ft 3 in) northwestward. Erzincanspor, the local football team, withdrew from the 1991–92 3. Lig on the 24th week after the earthquake.

=== Geological effects ===
The mainshock triggered widespread landslides, rockslides, and avalanches in the shaken regions. Most of the surface effects occurred in steep areas, where road surfaces were damaged and transportation routes were cut off. Ground fissures and liquefaction also occurred in nearby localities. Sand boils were also reported. Additionally, small springs smelling of sulfur and burnt grass were found nearby a small scarp.

== Aftermath ==
In the immediate aftermath, the military stationed in Erzincan assisted search and rescue. However, due to a lack of equipment and experience, the initial search and rescue effort was not very productive. 75 prisoners in a local jail attempted to escape during the chaos, but were unsuccessful. Due to the damaged state of the area's hospitals, many patients were driven by ambulance or medevaced to nearby Erzurum, with some being transported as far as Ankara. However, a field hospital with 200 beds was set up. In the days after, international search and rescue teams were deployed to assist Turkish authorities. Countries such as Germany, France, Switzerland, the United States, and Iran sent specialized urban search and rescue (USAR) teams, many equipped with sniffer dogs, acoustic detection devices, and other tools for locating survivors trapped under rubble. Search and rescue teams had started to leave the affected area by March 19. Other countries such as Greece, Finland, and Sweden also donated equipment such as tents and planes. 20,000 blankets and 500,000 kg (1,100,000 lb) of food were given out to the affected. The Turkish government provided interest-free loans to repair or reconstruct houses that were damaged or destroyed. New hospitals, roads, and government offices were built following the earthquake. Additionally, retail and commercial areas along with water and sewage plants were fixed up. The provision of housing built following the earthquake is now listed by the Chamber of Civil Engineers in Turkey as one of the Fifty civil engineering feats in Turkey.

== See also ==
- List of earthquakes in 1992
- List of earthquakes in Turkey
