= 2022 Düzce earthquake =

Earthquake in Turkey

- Location within Turkey
- UTC time: 2022-11-23 01:08:15
- ISC event: 625260611
- USGS-ANSS: ComCat
- Local date: 23 November 2022
- Local time: 04:08 TST (UTC+03:00)
- Magnitude: 6.1 M_{ww}
- Depth: 10.6 km (6.6 mi)
- Epicenter: 40.847°N 30.967°E
- Fault: North Anatolian Fault
- Type: Strike-slip
- Areas affected: Turkey
- Max. intensity: MMI VIII (Severe)
- Casualties: 2 dead (indirect), 93 injured

On 23 November 2022, a magnitude 6.1 earthquake struck near Düzce, Turkey, at a depth of 10.6 km (6.6 mi). It left 2,917 buildings damaged or destroyed and indirectly killed two people.

== Tectonic setting ==
The location, depth, and focal mechanism of the earthquake are consistent with the east–west trending, right-lateral North Anatolian Fault. The North Anatolian Fault accommodates much of the right-lateral horizontal motion (23–24 mm/yr) between the Anatolian micro-plate and the Eurasian plate as the Anatolian micro-plate is being pushed westward to further accommodate closure of the Mediterranean basin caused by the collision of the African plate and Arabian plate in southeastern Turkey. At the location of this earthquake, the Arabian plate moves north-northwest at a velocity of about 17 mm/yr relative to the Eurasian plate.

The North Anatolian Fault experiences a high seismic activity. In the past 50 years, there were 13 other earthquakes of magnitude 5.5 and larger within 250 km (160 mi) of the November 23, 2022 earthquake. The largest was a M_{w} 7.6 earthquake on August 17, 1999, located about 95 km (59 mi) to the east. Three M_{w} 7 or larger earthquakes have occurred within 25 km (16 mi) of this earthquake, the most recent being a M_{w} 7.2 on 12 November 1999.

== Earthquake ==
The earthquake measured M_{ww} 6.1 by the United States Geological Survey, while the Kandilli Observatory, and AFAD measured it at M_{w} 6.0 and 5.9 respectively. The earthquake was the result of strike-slip faulting at shallow depth, within the crust. Focal mechanism solutions for the event indicate that rupture occurred on either a moderately-dipping right-lateral fault striking west-southwest, or a steeply-dipping left-lateral strike-slip fault striking north-northwest. It occurred ten days after Turkey held a national drill to commemorate the 23rd anniversary of a 1999 earthquake which killed 710 people in the same area.

== Impact ==
One person died from a heart attack, and another died after fleeing his house in panic. At least 2,548 buildings were damaged, while another 369 structures collapsed, according to the Ministry of Interior. Damage mainly consisted of collapsed walls and items being knocked off shelves. The Düzce Courthouse experienced falling concrete roof tiles. About 80 percent of buildings in the area were reconstructed or retrofitted after the 1999 earthquakes, reducing the impact.

Power was interrupted in the region. The earthquake caused fear and panic among residents. Many fled into the streets, and some people in Bolu jumped from balconies. At least 93 people were injured, one of them in serious condition. Of the 93, 37 were in Düzce; 26 from Sakarya; 14 in Bolu; ten in Zonguldak; nine in Sakarya; four in Bursa; and two others from Istanbul. Shaking was felt as far as Istanbul, Ankara, Bolu, Eskişehir, Kütahya, Bursa, Kocaeli and Edirne.

== Aftermath ==
Cevdet Atay, the Governor of Düzce, said teams have been dispatched to the area. School and work was suspended for a day.

== See also ==
- List of earthquakes in 2022
- List of earthquakes in Turkey
