= List of earthquakes in Turkey =

Map of earthquakes in Turkey, 1900–2023

Map of plate boundaries affecting Turkey

Turkey has had many earthquakes. This list includes any notable historical earthquakes that have epicenters within the current boundaries of Turkey, or which caused significant effects in this area. Overall, the population in major cities like Istanbul resides in structures that are a mix of vulnerable and earthquake resistant construction.

Location of major earthquakes in Turkey with year of occurrence

== Tectonic setting ==
Turkey is a seismically active area within the complex zone of collision between the Eurasian plate and both the African and Arabian plates. Much of the country lies on the Anatolian sub-plate, a small plate bounded by two major strike-slip fault zones, the North Anatolian Fault and East Anatolian Fault. The western part of the country is also affected by the zone of extensional tectonics in the Aegean Sea caused by the southward migration of the Hellenic arc. The easternmost part of Turkey lies on the western end of the Zagros fold and thrust belt, which is dominated by thrust tectonics.

== Seismic hazard ==
Seismic hazard in Turkey is highest along the plate boundaries, but there is a significant risk of damaging earthquakes almost anywhere in the country. Seismic maps that show risk have changed through time.

== Buildings ==
Planning decisions affect architects. In earthquake-prone areas, all buildings built to 20th century standards may be dangerous, but shortly after the 1999 İzmit earthquake, which killed over 17 thousand people, a new seismic code was brought into force to protect against earthquakes in Turkey. That earthquake exposed many architectural design errors. Also following that earthquake a so-called earthquake tax was raised during the government of Bülent Ecevit. Initially thought as a temporary tax, it became permanent. In 2007 the seismic code was strengthened. However, it is alleged that builders often ignored the rules due to corruption. After the 2011 Van earthquakes Prime Minister Recep Tayyip Erdoğan said: "Municipalities, constructors and supervisors should now see that their negligence amounts to murder." In 2018, a zoning law gave amnesties to some unlicensed buildings and some with unlicensed floors.

Further resilience over the 2007 code was mandated in the 2018 Turkish Seismic Code, which took effect on 1 January 2019. Improvements included design supervision and site specific hazard definitions, and for new buildings in vulnerable regions required rebar in high quality concrete. Beams and columns in those buildings must be in the right place to properly absorb shaking. The code is said by foreign experts to be very modern and similar to US codes. However, these 21st-century building codes were not very well enforced.

In a bid to shore up support going into the 2018 Turkish presidential election, the government offered amnesties for violations of the building code, allowing non-compliance to continue with the payment of a fee. This poor enforcement of seismic codes was a contributing factor to the devastation of the 2023 Turkey–Syria earthquakes in which over 42,000 people died in Turkey. There were high incidences of support column failure leading to pancake collapses, which complicated rescue efforts. Experts lamented the practice would turn cities into graveyards. The 2023 Turkey–Syria earthquakes collapsed many older buildings and some recent ones. In the couple of months after those earthquakes a flurry of articles was published. A checklist for sustainable urban design has been created.

Unreinforced masonry buildings are vulnerable. Many older buildings in Istanbul are vulnerable to pancake collapses. Retrofitting old buildings is possible but expensive. Although over 3 million housing units nationwide were strengthened in the 2 decades before 2023, as of that year many apartment blocks do not meet 21st century standards. Building with wood has been suggested. Post disaster architecture in a village has been studied.

== List of notable earthquakes ==
=== Historical earthquakes in Turkey (before 1900) ===
Date	Time‡	Place	Lat	Long	Deaths	Imax	Mag.	Comments	Sources
17	n/a	Philadelphia (Alaşehir)	38.21	28.31	n/a		n/a	see AD 17 Lydia earthquake	
13 December 115		Antioch	36.1	36.1	260,000	XI	7.5 M_{s}	see 115 Antioch earthquake	
4 January 141 (or 142)		Lycia, Caria, Dodecanese	36.7	28.0	n/a	VIII	n/a	Triggered a severe tsunami that caused inundation at Rhodes; see 141 Lycia earthquake	
21 December 262		South and west coasts of Anatolia	36.5	27.8	n/a	IX	n/a	Damaged many buildings at Ephesus and triggered a tsunami that hit coastal cities; see 262 Southwest Anatolia earthquake	
26 January 447	Night	Bithynia, Thrace, Byzantine Empire	41.008	28.978	Unknown	IX		Date uncertain, severely damaged the Theodosian walls in Constantinople see 447 Constantinople earthquake	
20 May 526		Antioch			250,000	VIII	7.0 M_{s}	The city of Antioch was greatly damaged, and some decades later the city's population was just 300,000. see 526 Antioch earthquake	
15 August 554		Anatolia						The earthquake severely damaged the city of Tralles (modern Aydın) and the island of Kos; See 554 Anatolia earthquake	
14 December 557	just before midnight	Constantinople	40.9	28.7	n/a	X	6.4 M_{w}	Constantinople was "almost completely razed to the ground" by the earthquake. see 557 Constantinople earthquake	
23 September 1063		Constantinople, Sea of Marmara	40.867	27.411		IX	7.15	see 1063 Marmara earthquake	
14 May 1269		Cilicia, Anatolia	37.5	35.5	60,000	VIII	~7	see 1269 Cilicia earthquake	–
10 September 1509		Istanbul	40.9	28.7	13,000	IX	7.2 M_{w}	see 1509 İstanbul earthquake	–
May 1598		Amasya and Çorum	40.6	35.4	60,000	IX	6.7 M_{s}	see 1598 Amasya–Çorum earthquake	–
23 February 1653		Smyrna	38.2	28.2	2,500	IX	7.5	see 1653 East Smyrna earthquake	
17 August 1668		Anatolia	40	36	8,000	IX	8	see 1668 North Anatolia earthquake	
10 July 1688	11:45	Smyrna	38.4	26.9	16,000	X	7.0 M_{s}	see 1688 Smyrna earthquake	
22 May 1766	05:10	Istanbul	40.8	29.0	4,000	IX	7.1 M_{s}	see 1766 Istanbul earthquake	
5 August 1766		Dardanelles	40.6	27.0	5,000	X	7.4 M_{w}	see 1766 Marmara earthquake	
18 July 1784		Erzincan	39.5	40.2	5,000–>10,000		7.6 M_{s}	see 1784 Erzincan earthquake	
2 July 1840		Ağrı	39.6	44.1	10,000	IX	7.4 M_{s}	May have triggered the last eruption of Mount Ararat. Casualties associated with a large landslide on the volcano. see 1840 Ahora earthquake	
28 February 1855	01:00	Bursa	40.2	29.1	1,900	X	6.7	see 1855 Bursa earthquake	
2 June 1859	10:30	Erzurum	39.9	41.3	15,000	IX	6.1 M_{s}	see 1859 Erzurum earthquake	
12 May 1866		Bingöl	39.2	41.0	680+	X	7.2 M_{s}	see 1866 Bingöl earthquake	
3 April 1872	–	Hatay	36.4	36.4	1,800	IX	7.2 M_{s}	see 1872 Amik earthquake	
	–	Afyonkarahisar	38.3	29.9	1,300	IX	6.77 M_{w}	see 1875 Dinar earthquake	
3 April 1881	11:30	Chios, Çeşme, Alaçatı	38.25	26.25	7,866	X	7.3 M_{w}	see 1881 Chios earthquake	
10 October 1883	13:30	Çeşme, İzmir, Ayvalık	38.3	26.2	53–120	IX	7.3 M_{s}	see 1883 Çeşme earthquake	
10 July 1894	12:24	Gulf of İzmit	40.73	29.25	1,300	X	7.0	see 1894 Istanbul earthquake	
20 September 1899	04:00	Büyük Menderes Graben	37.9	28.1	1,470	IX	7.1	see 1899 Aydın–Denizli earthquake	

=== 1900–1999 ===
Date	Time‡	Place	Lat	Long	Deaths	Mag.	Comments	Sources
29 April 1903	01:46 local time	Malazgirt	39.14	42.65	600	6.7 M_{s}	see 1903 Manzikert earthquake	
9 August 1912	03:29 local time	Mürefte	40.75	27.2	216	7.3 M_{S}	see 1912 Mürefte earthquake	
4 October 1914	00:07 local time	Burdur	37.82	30.27	2,344	6.9 M_{S}	see 1914 Burdur earthquake	
18 November 1919	00:54 local time	Balıkesir	39.18	27.65	3,000	7.0 M_{w}	see 1919 Ayvalık earthquake	
13 September 1924	16:34 local time	Horasan	40.0	42.1	60	6.8	see 1924 Pasinler earthquake	
22 October 1926	21:59 local time	Kars	40.7	43.7	360	6.0 M_{s}	see 1926 Kars earthquake	
31 March 1928	02:29 local time	Smyrna	38.5	28.0	50	6.5 M_{S}	Possible M=6.2 foreshock previous day	
18 May 1929	08:37 local time	Suşehri	40.2	37.9	64	6.1	see 1929 Suşehri earthquake	
7 May 1930	00:34 local time	Hakkâri	38.1	44.7	2,514	7.2–7.5 M_{s}	see 1930 Salmas earthquake	
4 January 1935	16:41 local time	Erdek	40.4	27.5	5	6.4 M_{s}		
19 April 1938	12:59 local time	Kırşehir	39.1	34.0	160	6.6 M_{S}	see 1938 Kırşehir earthquake	
22 September 1939	02:36 local time	Dikili	39.1	26.8	60	6.6 M_{S}		
27 December 1939	01:57 local time	Erzincan	39.77	39.53	32,700	7.8 M_{w}	see 1939 Erzincan earthquake	
15 November 1942	19:01 local time	Bigadiç	39.2	28.2	16	6.1 M_{S}		
20 December 1942	14:03	Erbaa	40.87	36.47	3,000	7.0 M_{s}	see 1942 Niksar–Erbaa earthquake	
20 June 1943	17:32 local time	Hendek	40.6	30.5	336	6.6 M_{S}	see 1943 Adapazarı–Hendek earthquake	
26 November 1943	22:20	Ladik	40.87	33.65	2,824–5,000	7.5 M_{w}	see 1943 Tosya–Ladik earthquake	
1 February 1944	03:25	Gerede	40.8	32.2	3,959	7.5	see 1944 Bolu–Gerede earthquake	
6 October 1944	04:34 local time	Ayvalık	39.37	26.53	30	6.8 M_{S}	see 1944 Gulf of Edremit–Ayvacik earthquake	
17 August 1949		Karlıova	39.54	40.57	450	6.8	see 1949 Karlıova earthquake	
13 August 1951	18:36	Kurşunlu	40.88	32.87	50	6.9	see 1951 Kurşunlu earthquake	
3 January 1952	08:03 local time	Hasankale	39.9	41.7	41	5.8	see 1952 Hasankale earthquake	
18 March 1953	21:06 local time	Yenice	40.02	27.53	265	7.2 M_{S}	see 1953 Yenice–Gönen earthquake	
7 September 1953	05.58 local time	Ovacık, Karabük	41.08	33.01	2	6.0 M_{s}		
16 July 1955	09:07 local time	Söke	37.55	27.05	23	6.8 M_{S}		
22 February 1956	22:31 local time	Eskişehir	39.89	30.49	1	6.4 M_{s}		
25 April 1957	04:25 local time	Fethiye	36.5	28.6	67	7.1 M_{S}	see 1957 Fethiye earthquakes	
26 May 1957	6:36	Abant	40.67	31.00	52	7.1	see 1957 Abant earthquake	
6 October 1964	16:31 local time	Manyas	40.1	27.93	23	7.0 M_{S}	see 1964 Manyas earthquake	
19 August 1966	12:23	Varto	39.17	41.56	2,394	6.8 M_{w}	see 1966 Varto earthquake	
22 July 1967	16:56	Mudurnu	40.67	30.69	89	7.2	see North Anatolian Fault	
3 September 1968	10:19 local time	Bartın	41.79	32.31	29	6.5 M_{S}	see 1968 Bartın earthquake	
28 March 1969	03:48 local time	Alaşehir	38.5	28.4	53	6.5 M_{S}	see 1969 Alaşehir earthquake	
28 March 1970	23:02 local time	Gediz	39.2	29.5	1,086	7.2 M_{S}	see 1970 Gediz earthquake	
12 May 1971	08:25 local time	Burdur	37.5	29.9	57	6.1 M_{S}		
22 May 1971	16:44	Bingöl	38.83	40.52	755	6.9 M_{w}	see 1971 Bingöl earthquake	
6 September 1975	12:20 local time	Lice	38.5	40.7	2,311	6.6 M_{S}	see 1975 Lice earthquake	
24 November 1976	14:22 local time	Muradiye	39.12	44.03	4,000	7.5 M_{S}	see 1976 Çaldıran–Muradiye earthquake	
25 March 1977		Palu	38.728	40.088	30	5.2 M_{w}		
30 October 1983	07:12 local time	Erzurum	40.33	42.19	1,342	6.9 M_{S}	see 1983 Erzurum earthquake	
13 March 1992	17.18	Erzincan	39.70	39.69	498	6.7 M_{w}	see 1992 Erzincan earthquake	
1 October 1995	17:57 local time	Dinar	38.06	30.13	90	6.1 M_{S}	see 1995 Dinar earthquake	
27 June 1998	16:55 local time	Ceyhan	36.88	35.31	146	6.3 M_{w}	see 1998 Adana–Ceyhan earthquake	
17 August 1999	03:02 local time	İzmit	40.77	30	17,127–18,373	7.6 M_{w}	see 1999 İzmit earthquake	
12 November 1999	18:57 local time	Düzce	40.75	31.16	894	7.2 M_{w}	(PDE Monthly Listing); see 1999 Düzce earthquake	USGS

=== 2000–present ===
Date	Time‡	Place	Lat	Long	Deaths	Mag.	Comments	Sources
3 February 2002	07:11	Afyon	38.573	31.271	44	6.5 M_{w}	(HRV); see 2002 Afyon earthquake	
27 January 2003	05:26	Pülümür	39.46	39.79	1	6.1 M_{w}	(HRV, USGS)	USGS
1 May 2003	00:27	Bingöl	39.01	40.46	177	6.4 M_{w}	(HRV, USGS); see 2003 Bingöl earthquake	
2 July 2004	01:30	Ağrı	39.71	44.02	18	5.1 M_{w}	(HRV); see 2004 Doğubayazıt earthquake	
8 March 2010	02:32	Elazığ	38.79	40.03	41	6.1 M_{w}	(HRV); see 2010 Elazığ earthquake	
19 May 2011	23:15	Kütahya	39.14	29.07	2	5.8 M_{w}	(HRV); see 2011 Kütahya earthquake	
23 October 2011	13:41	Van	38.63	43.49	604	7.2 M_{w}	(HRV); see 2011 Van earthquakes	
9 November 2011	19:23	Van	38.42	43.22	40	5.6 M_{w}	(HRV): see 2011 Van earthquakes	
24 May 2014	12:25 local time	Imbros	40.31	25.45	0	6.9 M_{w}	(HRV); see 2014 Aegean Sea earthquake	
21 July 2017	01:31 local time	Bodrum	36.92	27.41	2 (in the Greek island of Kos)	6.6 M_{w}	(HRV); see 2017 Aegean Sea earthquake	
26 September 2019	13:59 local time	Marmara region	40.89	28.17	1	5.7 M_{w}	(HRV); see 2019 Istanbul earthquake	
24 January 2020	20:55 local time	Elazığ, Malatya	38.390	39.081	41	6.7 M_{w}	(HRV); see 2020 Elazığ earthquake	
23 February 2020	08:53 local time	Iran–Turkey border	38.3943	44.3405	10	5.8 M_{w}	(HRV); see 2020 Iran–Turkey earthquakes	
23 February 2020	19:00 local time	Iran–Turkey border	38.3943	44.3405	10	6.0 M_{w}	(HRV); see 2020 Iran–Turkey earthquakes	
14 June 2020	16:24 local time	Bingöl	39.42	40.67	1	5.9 M_{w}	see 2020 Bingöl earthquake	
30 October 2020	14:51 local time	Aegean Sea	37.918	26.790	117	7.0 M_{w}	see 2020 Aegean Sea earthquake	
23 November 2022	04:08 local time	Düzce	40.847	30.967	2	6.1 M_{w}	see 2022 Düzce earthquake	
6 February 2023	04:17 local time	Kahramanmaraş	37.112	37.119	62,013 (53,537 in Turkey, 8,476 in Syria)	7.8 M_{w}	see 2023 Turkey–Syria earthquakes	
6 February 2023	13:24 local time	Kahramanmaraş	38.036	37.229	62,013 (53,537 in Turkey, 8,476 in Syria)	7.5–7.7 M_{w}	see 2023 Turkey–Syria earthquakes	
20 February 2023	20:04 local time	Defne	36.113	36.082	11 (6 in Turkey, 5 in Syria)	6.4 M_{w}	see 2023 Turkey–Syria earthquakes	
27 February 2023	12:04 local time	Yeşilyurt	38.2535	38.2932	2	5.2 M_{w}	see 2023 Turkey–Syria earthquakes	
23 April 2025	12:49 local time	Istanbul, Sea of Marmara	40.840	28.142	1 (indirect)	6.2 M_{w}	see 2025 Istanbul earthquake	
3 June 2025	02:17 local time	Muğla	36.8	28.3	1 (indirect)	5.8 M_{w}	Earthquake off Marmaris coast.	
10 August 2025	19:53 local time	Balıkesir	39.312	28.069	2	6.1 M_{w}	see 2025 Balıkesir earthquakes	
27 October 2025	22:48 local time	Balıkesir	39.223	28.228	0	6.0 M_{w}	see 2025 Balıkesir earthquakes	

== See also ==
- Geology of Turkey
- List of earthquakes in the Levant
- List of historical earthquakes
