= 1784 Erzincan earthquake =

Earthquake in Turkey

- Location within Turkey
- Local date: 18 July 1784
- Magnitude: 7.6 M_{s}
- Epicenter: 39.5°N 40.2°E
- Fault: North Anatolian Fault
- Type: Strike-slip
- Areas affected: Erzincan; Ottoman Empire
- Casualties: 5,000–>10,000 dead

Erzincan in Turkey, then part of the Ottoman Empire, was struck by a major earthquake on 18 July 1784. It caused widespread damage between Erzincan and Muş. It had an estimated magnitude of 7.6 M_{s}. More than 90% of the houses in Erzincan collapsed and at least 5,000 people died, with some reports of more than 10,000 deaths. A 150 km long zone of surface rupture was observed. It ruptured the Yedisu segment at the eastern end of the North Anatolian Fault, which has not ruptured since then and is now regarded as a seismic gap. In 2013 it was estimated that about 2.67 m of displacement deficit has accumulated on this fault segment since 1784, sufficient to drive an earthquake of up to M_{w}7.5.
