= 1999 Düzce earthquake =

1999 earthquake in north-central Turkey

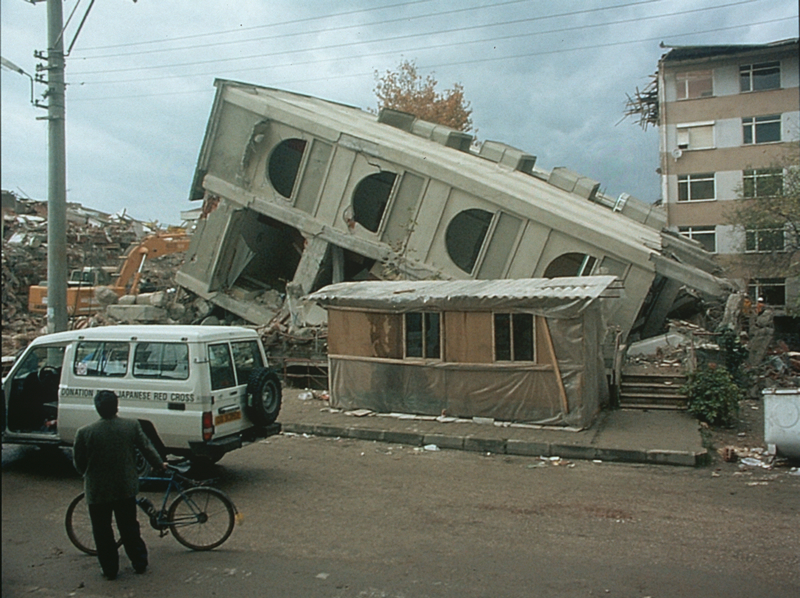
- Collapsed building in Düzce

- Location within Marmara Location within Turkey
- UTC time: 1999-11-12 16:57:22
- ISC event: 1650092
- USGS-ANSS: ComCat
- Local date: 12 November 1999
- Local time: 18:57:22
- Magnitude: 7.2 M_{w}
- Depth: 13.7 km (9 mi)
- Epicenter: 40.82°N 31.2°E
- Fault: North Anatolian Fault
- Type: Strike-slip
- Areas affected: Turkey
- Total damage: $1 billion
- Max. intensity: MMI IX (Violent)
- Casualties: 845–894 dead 4,948 injured 55,000 displaced

The 1999 Düzce earthquake occurred on 12 November at 18:57:22 local time with a moment magnitude of 7.2 and a maximum Mercalli intensity of IX (Violent), causing damage and at least 845 fatalities in Düzce, Turkey. The epicenter was approximately 100 km (62 mi) to the east of the extremely destructive 1999 İzmit earthquake that happened nearly three months earlier. Both strike-slip earthquakes were caused by movement on the North Anatolian Fault.

== Tectonic setting ==
The western and central parts of Turkey lie on the eastern part of the Anatolian plate, which is currently being forced to the west by the continuing northward movement of the Arabian plate. In northern Turkey, this westward motion is taken up by a major zone of dextral (right-lateral) strike-slip, the North Anatolian Fault. The 1999 Düzce event is the most recent in a sequence of large earthquakes that have affected the North Anatolian Fault, starting towards the eastern end with the 1939 Erzincan earthquake, then propagating towards the west with events in 1942, 1943, 1944, 1951, 1957, 1967 and finally the 1999 İzmit event. At its western end the North Anatolian Fault splits into two main segments, with the northern of these giving rise to the 1999 earthquakes.

== Earthquake ==
The earthquake had an estimated magnitude in the range 7.1–7.2 on the moment magnitude scale. The International Seismological Centre gives a magnitude of 7.16±0.1 for this event in their catalogue. The maximum measured intensity was IX at a seismometer about 4 km from the epicentre, with a peak ground acceleration of 147.80%g and a peak ground velocity of 113.02 cm/sec.

=== Ground rupture ===
A surface rupture of 40 km was identified in the field along the Düzce Fault, part of the northern splay of the North Anatolian Fault. This was extended by an additional 15 km at the eastern end using SPOT imagery. The maximum identified lateral displacement was 5 m, with an average displacement of 3 m. At the western end of the fault, there was a maximum 3.5 m of vertical displacement.

=== Rupture propagation ===
Analysis of seismometer records suggests that the rupture propagated towards the east faster than the S wave velocity (supershear) and to the west slower than the S-wave velocity. Supershear rupture propagation is characteristic of strike-slip earthquakes, particularly on fault segments that are relatively simple and planar in geometry.

== Impact ==
Düzce and surrounding areas had already been quite badly affected by the İzmit earthquake a few months earlier, so that many buildings were already in a weakened state when the November earthquake struck.

The death toll in Düzce was 478, with an additional 313 fatalities in Kaynaşlı and 48 more in Bolu. A significant number of deaths were attributed to the presence of traditional heaters causing fires and related smoke effects, particularly in Kaynaşlı. Thirty people were also injured in Zonguldak.

== Relief efforts ==
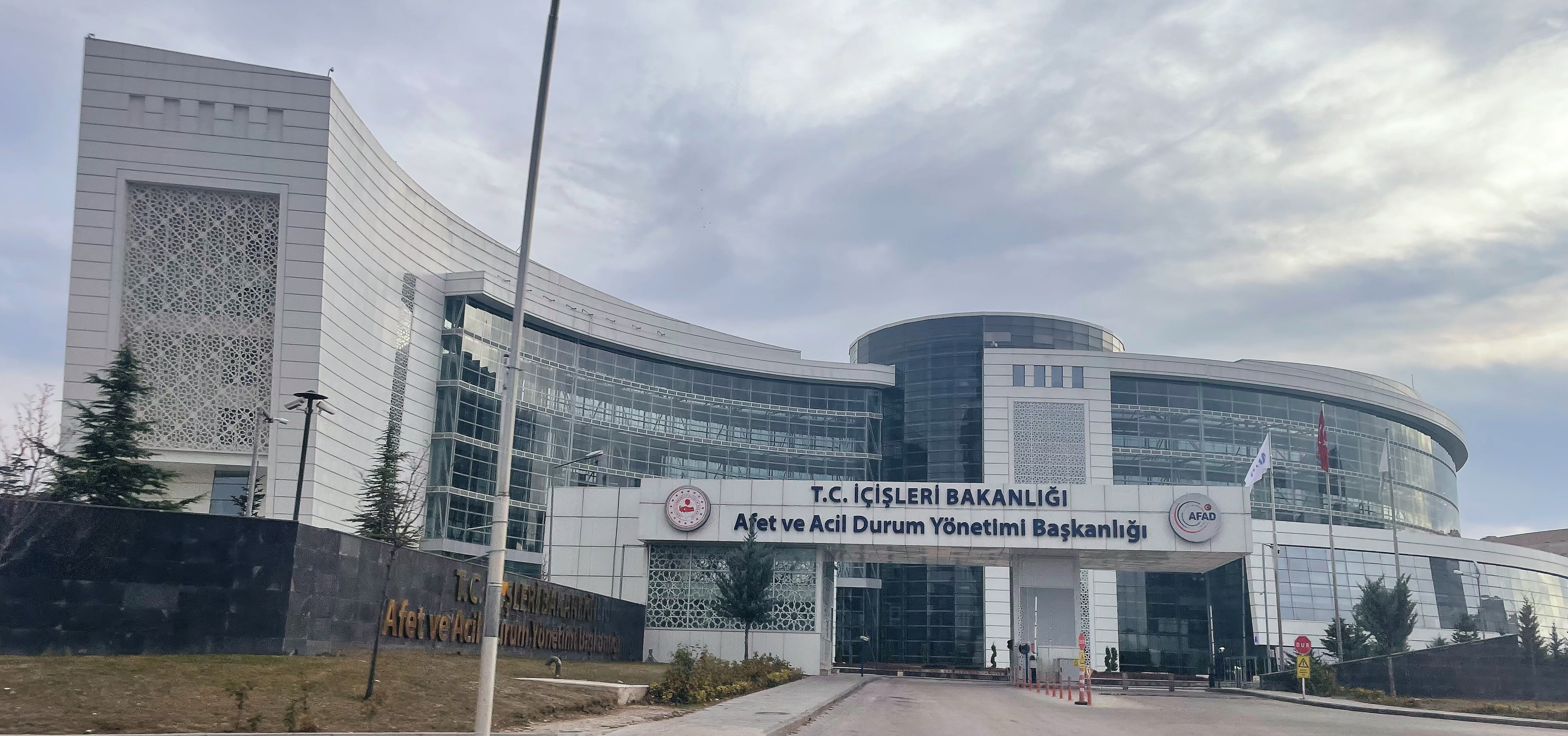
Disaster and Emergency Management Presidency established in order to prepare for future events.

Following criticism of their response to the İzmit earthquake, the Turkish government reacted quickly to the November earthquake, with rapid deployment of military personnel, police and medical teams to the area. Field hospitals were provided by teams from Russia, Japan, Egypt and Israel. Search and rescue teams were sent from many countries including Austria, Cyprus, Denmark, Finland, Bulgaria, Czech Republic, Hungary, Slovenia, Italy, Poland, Ukraine, Romania, Israel, United Kingdom, United States, Greece, Germany, Russia, Spain, the Netherlands, France, Algeria, Sweden and Switzerland. An estimated 2,000 rescuers were present, including 150 search dogs.

Many of those made homeless by the earthquake were temporarily placed in encampments, but this was problematic as the weather was generally wet and temperatures at night were at or near freezing and many of the tents were not "winterized". A year after the earthquake, about 7,500 people were still living in tents with about 30,000 accommodated in prefabricated houses.

== Aftermath ==
The catastrophic loss of life during the earthquake, largely attributed to poor construction practices and building code violations, sparked a profound national outcry in Turkey. In the aftermath of the disaster, legal proceedings were initiated against contractors whose substandard work directly contributed to the collapses. Several businessmen, including Veli Göçer and Hamza Cebeci, were tried, convicted of negligent homicide, and sentenced to prison for their roles in the collapse of poorly constructed buildings. Responding to the public outrage and the systemic failures exposed by the disaster, the Ecevit government subsequently passed new legislation designed to improve construction quality and enforce stricter building standards.

== Gallery ==
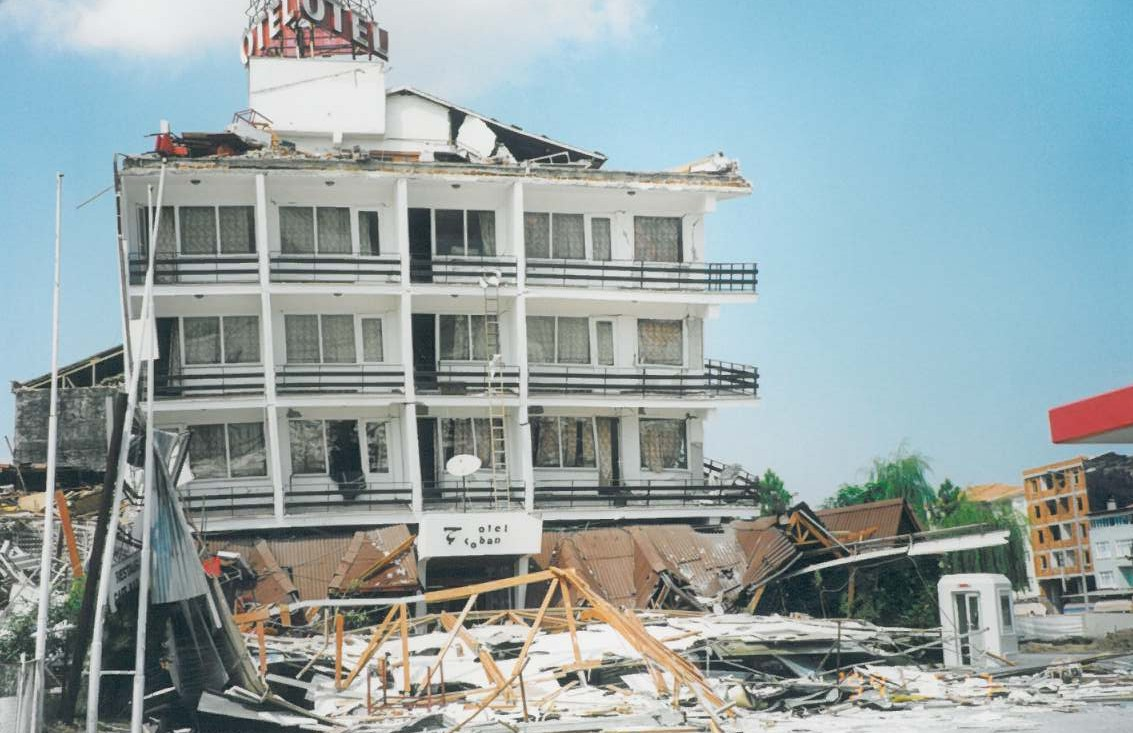

== See also ==
- List of earthquakes in 1999
- List of earthquakes in Turkey
