= 1951 Kurşunlu earthquake =

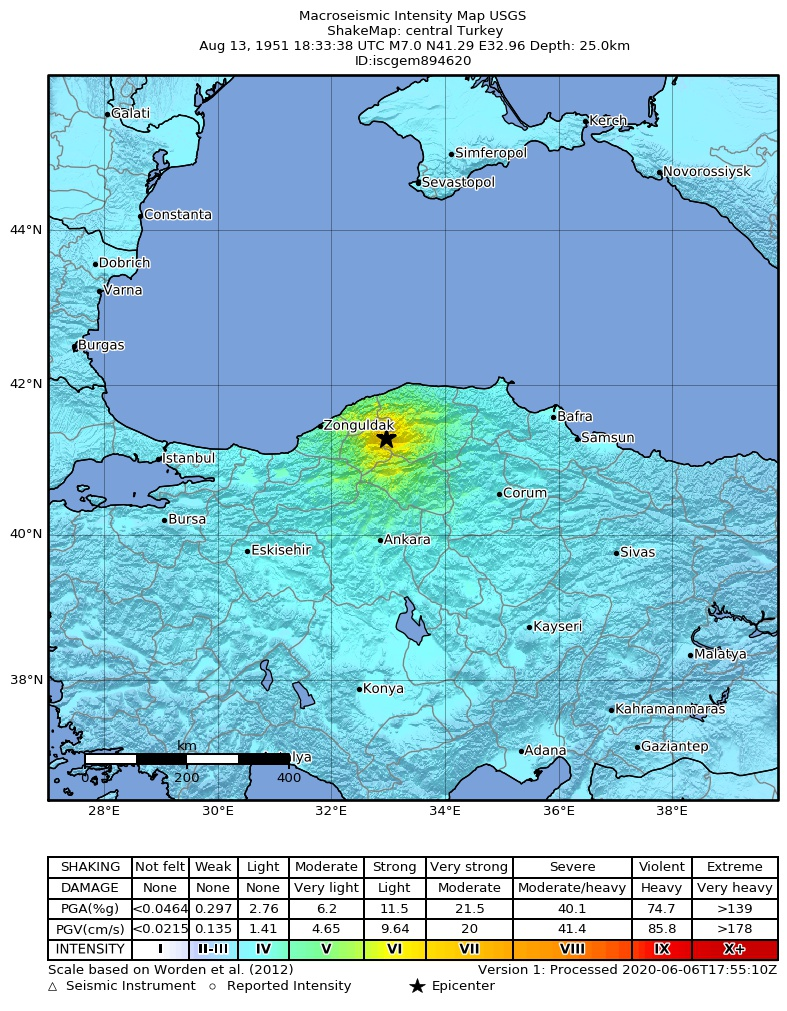

- Location within Turkey
- UTC time: 1951-08-13 18:33:38
- ISC event: 894620
- USGS-ANSS: ComCat
- Local date: 13 August 1951
- Local time: 20:33
- Magnitude: 6.9 M_{s}
- Epicenter: 40.88°N 32.87°E
- Areas affected: Turkey
- Max. intensity: MMI IX (Violent)
- Casualties: 50 killed, 3,354 injured

The 1951 Kurşunlu earthquake occurred at 18:33 GMT (20:33 local time) on 13 August near Kurşunlu, Çankırı Province, Central Anatolia Region, Turkey. The earthquake was one of a series of major and intermediate quakes that have occurred in modern times along the North Anatolian Fault since 1939.

It had a magnitude of 6.9 on the surface-wave magnitude scale and a maximum felt intensity of IX (Violent) on the Mercalli intensity scale. There were 50 casualties and 3,354 injuries.

== See also ==
- List of earthquakes in 1951
- List of earthquakes in Turkey
