= 1653 Smyrna earthquake =

Earthquake in Turkey

- Location within Turkey
- Local date: 23 February 1653
- Magnitude: 6.72±0.3 M_{w}
- Epicenter: 38.20°N 28.20°E
- Areas affected: Turkey, İzmir, Aydın
- Max. intensity: MMI X (Extreme)
- Casualties: 2,500

The 1653 Smyrna earthquake occurred on 23 February, with an estimated magnitude of 6.72±0.3 M_{w} and a maximum felt intensity of X (Extreme) on the Mercalli intensity scale.

The event was particularly devastating because it triggered a tsunami, which caused additional destruction and casualties along the coastline. The earthquake and its aftermath were documented in historical records and have been studied by modern seismologists to better understand the seismic activity in the region.

== See also ==
- List of earthquakes in Turkey
- List of historical earthquakes
