= Earthquake tax =

Tax in Turkey

The so-called earthquake tax (also officially known as special communications tax) was introduced in the aftermath of the earthquake in İzmit in 1999 during which over 17,000 people died. Initially introduced as a temporary tax, it became a permanent tax aimed at the prevention of earthquake-related damage.

== Establishment ==
The earthquake tax was established in November 1999 during the government of Bülent Ecevit and was directed at cable TV, mobile calls, and messaging. With law No. 4481, taxes on income, vehicle, real estate, private communication and private transaction were added. In 2003 most of the taxes were abolished, but the private communication tax remained and became permanent. The tax was initially 7.5% on private communication, but over a presidential decree it was raised to 10% in early 2021.

== Aims and use ==
With the taxes, buildings were to be prepared better for earthquakes. Telecommunications services were also meant to be improved. The Disaster and Emergency Management Presidency (AFAD) was able to build logistic hubs in 25 provinces for disaster prevention. Then, further logistic centers for goods for use after disasters were established in 65 provinces. In 2012, the government announced a new plan aimed at reinforcing buildings to make them earthquake-proof. In a 2011 video, Minister of Treasury, Mehmet Şimşek says that the tax money was used for several transport and agriculture projects.

== Amount raised ==
There are different calculations possible regarding the amount of the money raised. As of 2023, the Turkish Government raised about $4.5 billion. But in view of the exchange rate of below 1.5 Turkish lira per dollar in 2006, the sum raised amounts to $37 billion. Similarly calculating, the Gazete Duvar reports that by 2020, between 67.5 – 140 billion lira have been raised since 1999.

== Criticism ==
After several earthquakes there arose questions on whether the tax money was distributed accordingly. Following the earthquake of February 2023, the Republican People's Party (CHP) claims that with the tax, millions of houses could have been made resistant to earthquakes, but the government instead used the money to fund its construction projects.
