= 1957 Abant earthquake =

Earthquake in Turkey

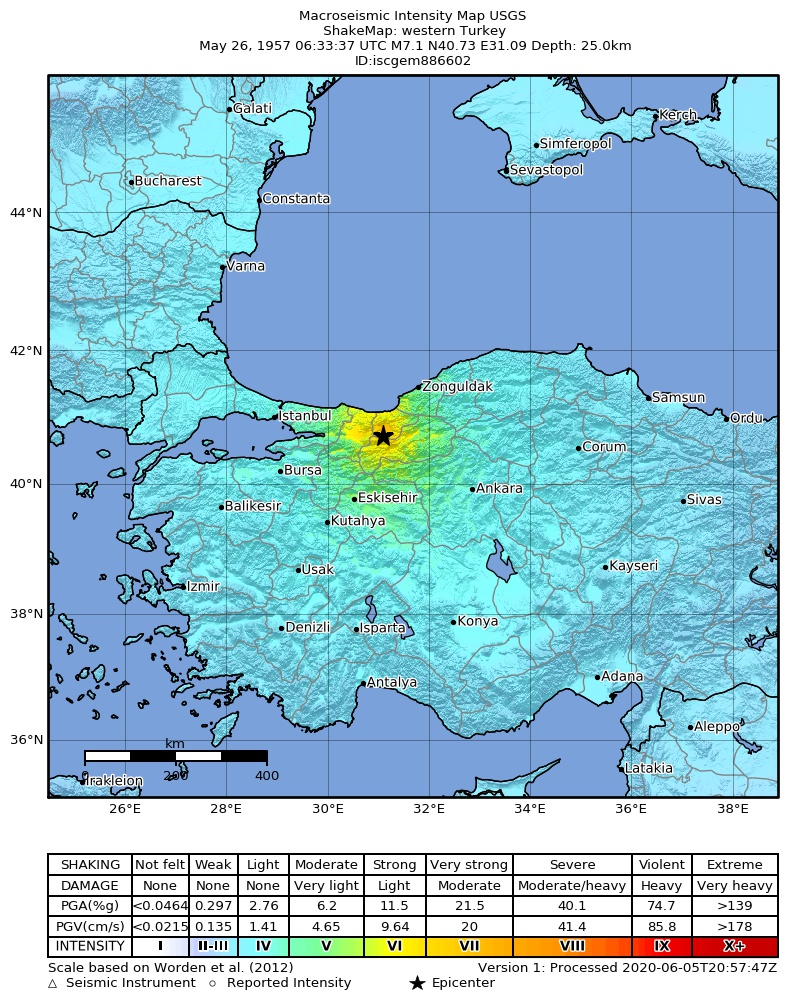
- USGS ShakeMap

- Location within Turkey
- UTC time: 1957-05-26 06:33:37
- ISC event: 886602
- USGS-ANSS: ComCat
- Local date: 26 May 1957
- Local time: 08:33:37
- Magnitude: 7.1 M_{s}
- Epicenter: 40.7°N 30.9°E
- Areas affected: Turkey
- Max. intensity: MMI IX (Violent)
- Casualties: 52 fatalities 101 injuries

The 1957 Abant earthquake occurred at 8:33am on 26 May, in Turkey. The earthquake had an estimated surface-wave magnitude of 7.1 and a maximum felt intensity of IX (Violent) on the Mercalli intensity scale, causing 52 fatalities and 101 injuries. Five thousand homes were damaged as a result of the earthquake.

== See also ==
- List of earthquakes in 1957
- List of earthquakes in Turkey
