= 1999 İzmit earthquake =

Earthquake in Kocaeli Province, Turkey

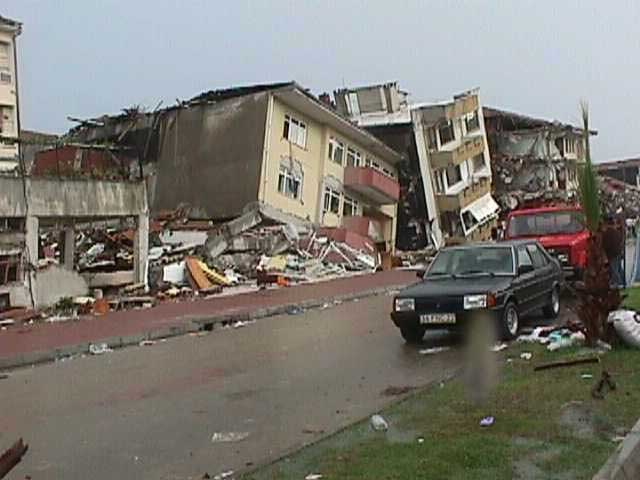
- Collapsed buildings in İzmit

- UTC time: 1999-08-17 00:01:38
- ISC event: 1655218
- USGS-ANSS: ComCat
- Local date: 17 August 1999
- Local time: 03:01
- Duration: 37 seconds
- Magnitude: 7.6 M_{w} 7.8 M_{s}
- Depth: 15.0 km (9.3 mi)
- Epicenter: 40.748°N 29.864°E
- Fault: North Anatolian Fault
- Type: Strike-slip
- Areas affected: Turkey
- Total damage: US$12-20 billion ($23-38.4 billion in 2025, adjusted for inflation)
- Max. intensity: MMI X (Extreme)
- Peak acceleration: 0.45 g
- Tsunami: 2.52 m (8.3 ft)
- Casualties: 17,127–18,373 dead 43,953–48,901 injured 5,840 missing

An earthquake of moment magnitude 7.6 struck Kocaeli Province, Turkey, on 17 August 1999. According to official figures, at least 18,373 people died and 48,901 people were injured during the earthquake, and 5,840 people were missing. At least 155 deaths were associated with the tsunami. The damage was estimated at between $12 billion and $20 billion (in 1999 U.S. dollars) according to various sources such as the World Bank. The earthquake was named for the epicenter's proximity to the northwestern city of İzmit. It occurred at 03:01 local time (00:01 UTC) at a shallow depth of 15 km (9.3 mi). A maximum Mercalli intensity of X (Extreme) was observed. The earthquake lasted for 37 seconds, causing seismic damage, and is widely remembered as one of the deadliest natural disasters in modern Turkish history.

The 1999 earthquake was part of a seismic sequence along the North Anatolian Fault that started in 1939, causing large earthquakes that moved progressively from east to west over a period of 60 years. The earthquake encouraged the establishment of a so-called earthquake tax aimed at providing assistance to those affected by the earthquake, and the creation of National Disaster Insurance Institution for providing compulsory earthquake insurance.

== Tectonic setting ==
The North Anatolian Fault Zone (NAFZ), where the earthquake occurred, is a 1,200 km (750 mi) right-lateral strike-slip fault zone. It extends from the Gulf of Saros to Karlıova. It formed around 13–11 million years ago in the eastern part of Anatolia and developed westwards. The fault eventually developed at the Marmara Sea around 200,000 years ago despite the shear-related movement in a rather broad zone which had already started in late Miocene.

The fault zone is seismically active and has a diverse geomorphological structure. It produced a series of earthquakes as large as 8.0 on the moment magnitude scale. Since the 17th century, it has shown cyclical behavior, with century-long large earthquake cycles beginning in the east and continuing westward. Although the record is less clear for earlier times, active seismicity was likely to have occurred. The 20th century earthquake record has shown that the earthquakes concentrate the stress at the western tips of the ruptured areas, leading to westward migration of larger earthquakes. The İzmit and 12 November 1999 events increased stress on the Marmara segment of the fault. An earthquake of up to magnitude 7.6 event was expected between 2005 and 2055 with a probability of 50 percent on this segment. Presently, the deformation of rocks by stress in the Marmara Sea region is asymmetric. This is conditioned by the regional geology and is believed to be representative of most of the NAFZ.

== Earthquake ==
Map of mainshock and aftershocks – Mw 4.0 or greater

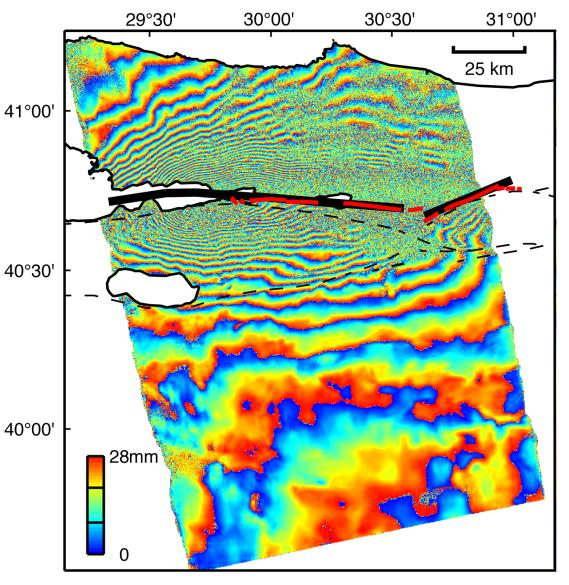
An interferogram image of the rupture caused by the earthquake

The 17 August 1999 earthquake was the seventh in a sequence of westward-migrating seismic sequence along the NAFZ. This earthquake sequence began in 1939 and ruptured along a 1000-km part of the fault zone, with horizontal displacements of up to 7.5 m (25 ft).

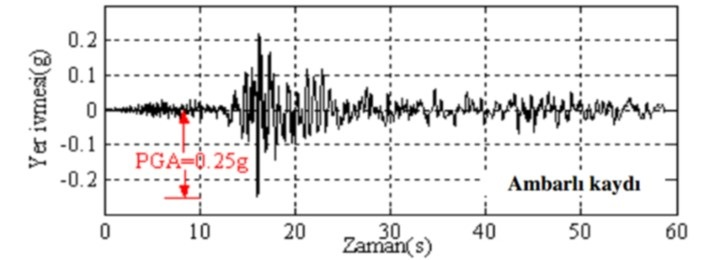
The waveform showing the peak ground acceleration recorded by a station in Ambarlı, Avcılar district, Istanbul

The maximum observed ground motion was 0.45 g. The earthquake lasted 35–45 seconds according to various sources. The closest cities affected were İzmit, Gölcük, Yalova, and Adapazarı, all of which are located near the eastern end of the Marmara Sea, within the Gulf of İzmit. The earthquake also caused serious damage in Istanbul, especially in the district of Avcılar which is located in the western part of the city, around 70 km (43 mi) away from the epicenter. Despite the distance, it killed about 1,000 people in the district. The earthquake caused a surface rupture comprising four segments; the Hersek/Karamürsel–Gölcük, İzmit–Lake Sapanca, Lake Sapanca–Akyazı, Akyazı–Gölyaka and Gölyaka–Düzce segments. These segments altogether measured over 125 km. All the segments are separated by pull-apart stepovers of 1–4 km (0.62–2.49 mi) in width. The maximum offset throughout the rupture was measured on the Sapanca–Akyazı segment where the surface break displaced a road and a tree line by 5.2 m (17 ft). It also showed pure strike-slip, and the fault plane is almost vertical in most of the places where a surface break was observed. Most of the major aftershocks (M>4) were located near Düzce, south of Adapazarı, in Sapanca, in İzmit, and the Çınarcık area. At Değirmendere, a small coastal town west of Gölcük, the rupture cut the edge of a fan delta where the center of the town was located, which caused a slump measuring 300 m (980 ft) long and 100 m (330 ft) wide. As a result, part of the town center slid under the water, including a hotel and several shops and restaurants. At another fan delta east of Gölcük, which is within the step-over area of the ruptures, the fault produced a 2 m-high normal fault scarp.

Data was used from seven broadband stations as well as some other short-period stations across the area to calculate the regional moment tensor of the mainshocks and larger aftershocks. As a result, most of the earthquakes were found to be split in segments, with the moment tensor's focal mechanism reading either a strike-slip on the fault which is west–east striking, or normal faulting which is between rupture segments. This also proves that the main characteristic of the quake is dextral strike-slip.

From the timing of P wave and S wave arrivals at seismometers, there is strong evidence that the rupture propagated eastwards from the epicenter at speeds in excess of the S-wave velocity, making this a supershear earthquake.

== Impact ==
=== Earthquake damage ===
Casualties by Turkish province
Province	Deaths	Injuries
Bolu	264	1,163
Bursa	263	333
Eskişehir	86	83
Istanbul	978	3,547
Kocaeli	8,644	9,211
Sakarya	2,627	5,084
Tekirdağ	0	35
Yalova	2,501	4,472
Zonguldak	3	26

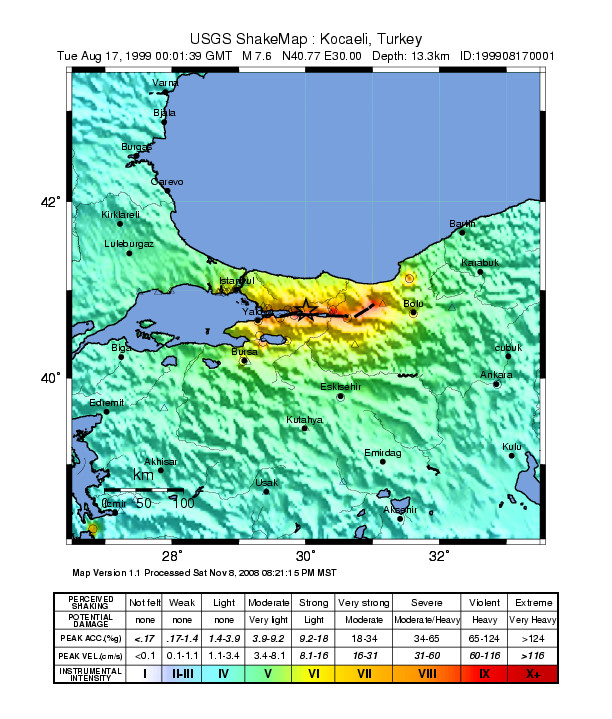
USGS ShakeMap showing the intensity of the event

Ten provinces were affected with deaths and collapsed buildings. An official Turkish estimate dated 19 October 1999 reported casualties of 17,127 killed and 43,953 injured, but many sources suggest the actual figure may have been closer to 45,000 dead and a similar number injured. Reports from September 1999 stated 127,251 buildings were damaged to varying extents and at least 60,434 others collapsed, while an American Red Cross report from 2003 estimated that 320,000 homes and businesses were destroyed. More than 250,000 people became homeless. About 60 km (37 mi) of the Istanbul-Ankara highway, almost 500 km (310 mi) electricity cables and over 3,000 electricity distribution towers were damaged.

Over 9,500 people were killed in İzmit. In Gölcük, at least 4,556 people died, 5,064 were injured, thousands more were left missing and at least 500 buildings collapsed, trapping about 20,000 families; overall, up to 80% of the city's buildings were damaged or destroyed. About 200 sailors went missing after a naval base collapsed. There was also destruction in Yalova, where 2,501 people died, 4,472 were injured and 10,134 buildings collapsed. The cause of most damage in Yalova was suspected to be liquefaction-induced. Since the area mostly comprised Quaternary alluvial soil, it was prone to liquefaction. The approximately 200 drilling sites and boreholes, and many streams and rivers, factored in the severe liquefaction.

In Istanbul, at least 978 people were killed and 3,547 others sustained injuries. Severe damage in the city was concentrated in Avcılar district. Avcılar was built on relatively weak ground, mainly composed of poorly consolidated Cenozoic sedimentary rocks, which made the district vulnerable to earthquakes. In Eskişehir, there were 86 deaths and 70 buildings collapsed. At least 263 people died and 333 others were injured in Bursa. Three deaths and 26 injuries were reported in Zonguldak. At least 2,627 people were also killed and 5,084 others were hurt in Sakarya Province.

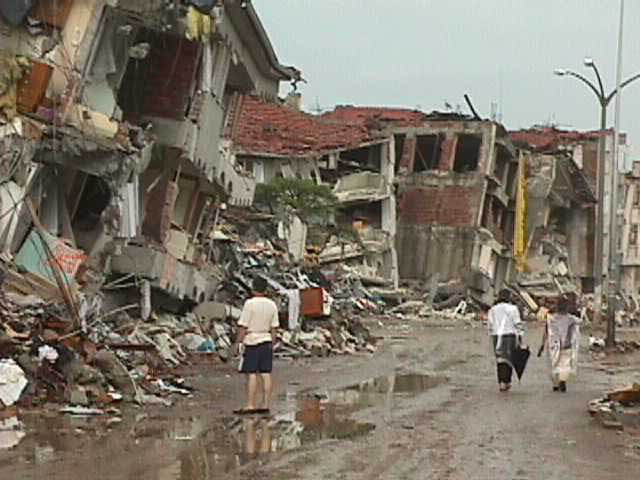
Collapsed buildings in Gölcük

Private contractors faced backlash for using cheap materials in their construction of residential buildings. Many of these contractors were prosecuted but few were found guilty. Government officials also faced backlash for not properly enforcing earthquake resistant building codes. Direct cost of damage is estimated at US$6.5 billion, but secondary costs exceeded US$20 billion. In 2010, the research branch of the Grand National Assembly of Turkey stated there were 18,373 deaths as a result. In the same report, it stated there were 48,901 injured, 505 permanently injured, 96,796 homes heavily damaged or destroyed, 15,939 businesses heavily damaged or destroyed, 107,315 homes moderately damaged, 16,316 businesses moderately damaged, 113,382 homes slightly damaged, 14,657 businesses slightly damaged, 40,786 prefabricated homes distributed and 147,120 people rehoused into these homes.

There was extensive damage to several bridges and other structures on the Trans-European Motorway, including 20 viaducts, 5 tunnels, and several overpasses. Damage ranged from spalling concrete to total deck collapse.

=== Oil refinery fire ===
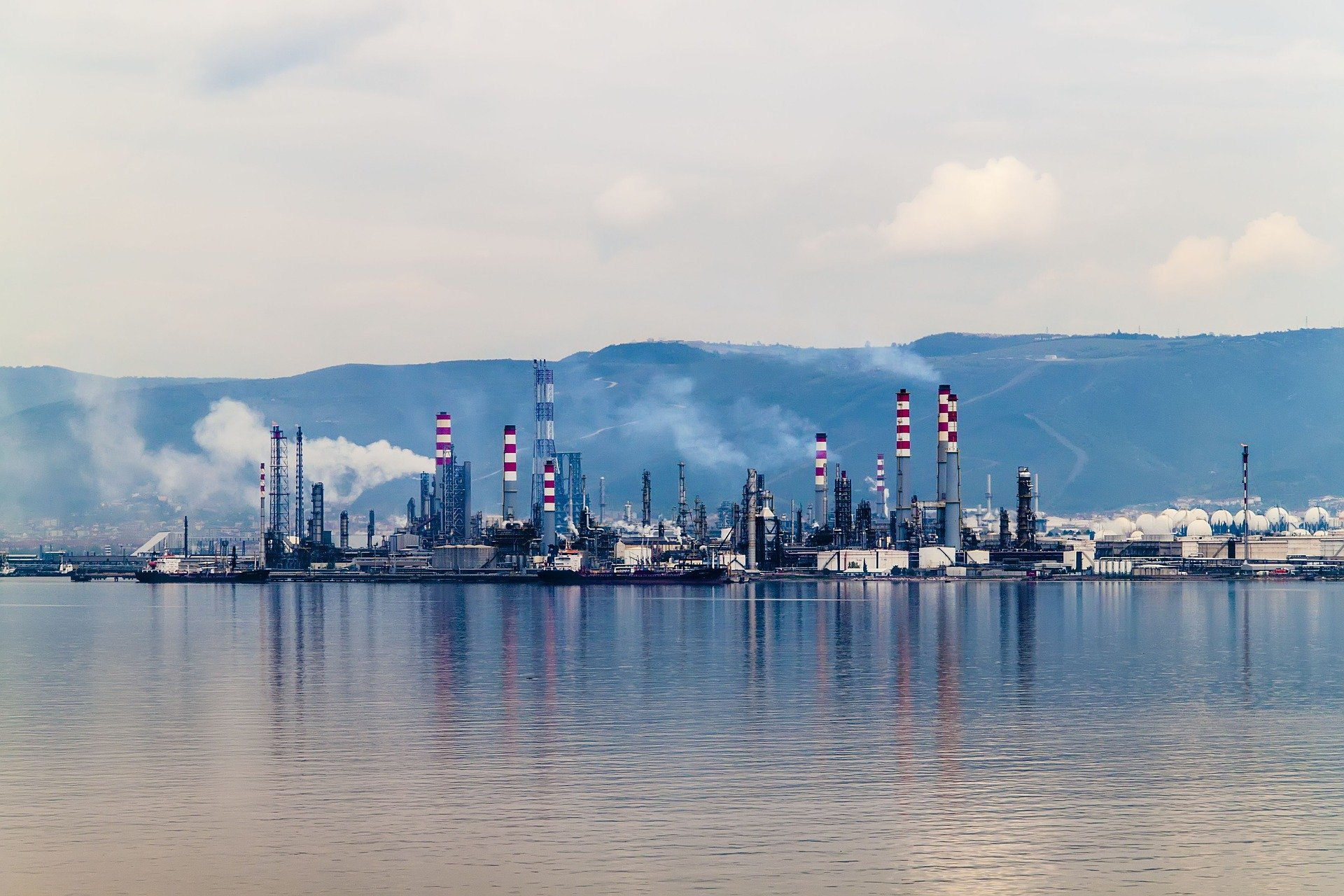
The Tüpraş refinery, where the fire occurred

The earthquake triggered a fire at the Tüpraş petroleum refinery. The fire began at a state-owned tank farm and was initiated by naphtha that had spilled from a holding tank. Breakage in water pipelines and earthquake damage made firefighting attempts ineffective. Aircraft were called in to douse the flames with foam, but the fire spread for several days. An evacuation was warranted for an area within 5 km (3.1 mi) of the refinery. The fire was declared under control five days later after claiming at least 17 tanks and an unknown quantity of complex piping. People within 2–3 mi (3.2–4.8 km) of the refinery had to evacuate despite some areas still being in the process of search and rescue.

=== Tsunami ===
At least 155 deaths were associated with the tsunami. Many field studies were made about the tsunami in the Gulf of İzmit. Along the northern coast of the gulf, in the basin between Hereke and Tüpraş Petroleum Refinery, the tsunami was recorded as a leading depression wave. The run-up wave heights in this area ranged 1.5–2.6 m (4 ft 11 in – 8 ft 6 in). The first series of waves arrived at the north coast a few minutes after the earthquake, and had a period of around a minute. The hardest hit areas were Şirinyalı, Kirazlıyalı, Yarımca, Körfez, and the refinery. The tsunami carried mussels into buildings, and damaged doors and windows. Körfez experienced flooding up to 35 m (115 ft) in some areas. Later, watermarks were seen on the walls of buildings, including the police station in Hereke, and at a restaurant near Körfez. Locals reported the first waves arrived at Kirazlıyalı from a southeastern direction, and at Körfez from a southern direction. Along the southern coast of the gulf between Değirmendere and Güzelyalı, run-up measured 0.8–2.5 m (2 ft 7 in – 8 ft 2 in). The tsunami was recorded as a leading depression wave to the west of Kavaklı up to Güzelyalı. There, the wave was noticed by locals immediately after the earthquake. There was severe coastal subsidence and slumping of a park near Değirmendere. The subsided area was 250 m (820 ft) along the shore and 70 m (230 ft) perpendicular to shore. The same area included two piers, a hotel, a restaurant, a cafe and several trees. Locals at the coast near Değirmendere observed the sea receding by about 150 m (490 ft) in less than two minutes. When the sea came back, it swept inland up to 35 m (115 ft), as shown by the mussels and dead fish left in the flooded areas. The tsunami also caused damage to the naval base nearby.

=== Aftershocks ===
A M_{w}5.2 aftershock occurred near İzmit on 31 August, causing one additional fatality and 166 injuries, with tremors being felt in Istanbul. Another M_{w}5.9 aftershock hit on 13 September, killing seven and injuring 422 people. Another aftershock measuring M_{w}5.2 occurred on 29 September, killing one person in Istanbul. A M_{w}5.0 aftershock on 7 November killed one person in Sakarya Province, while another M_{w}5.7 event on 11 November in the same province caused two deaths and 171 injuries. On 23 August 2000, a M_{w}5.3 earthquake caused 22 injuries in Sakarya. Another M_{w}5.0 aftershock was recorded on 26 August 2001, causing two injuries in Bolu.

Damage assessment statistics by province
Province	Destroyed	Moderately damaged	Slightly damaged
Bolu	3,226	4,782	3,233
Bursa	32	109	431
Eskişehir	70	32	204
Istanbul	3,614	12,370	10,630
Kocaeli	23,254	21,316	21,481
Sakarya	20,104	11,381	17,953
Yalova	10,134	8,870	14,470
Total:	60,434	58,860	68,391

== Response ==
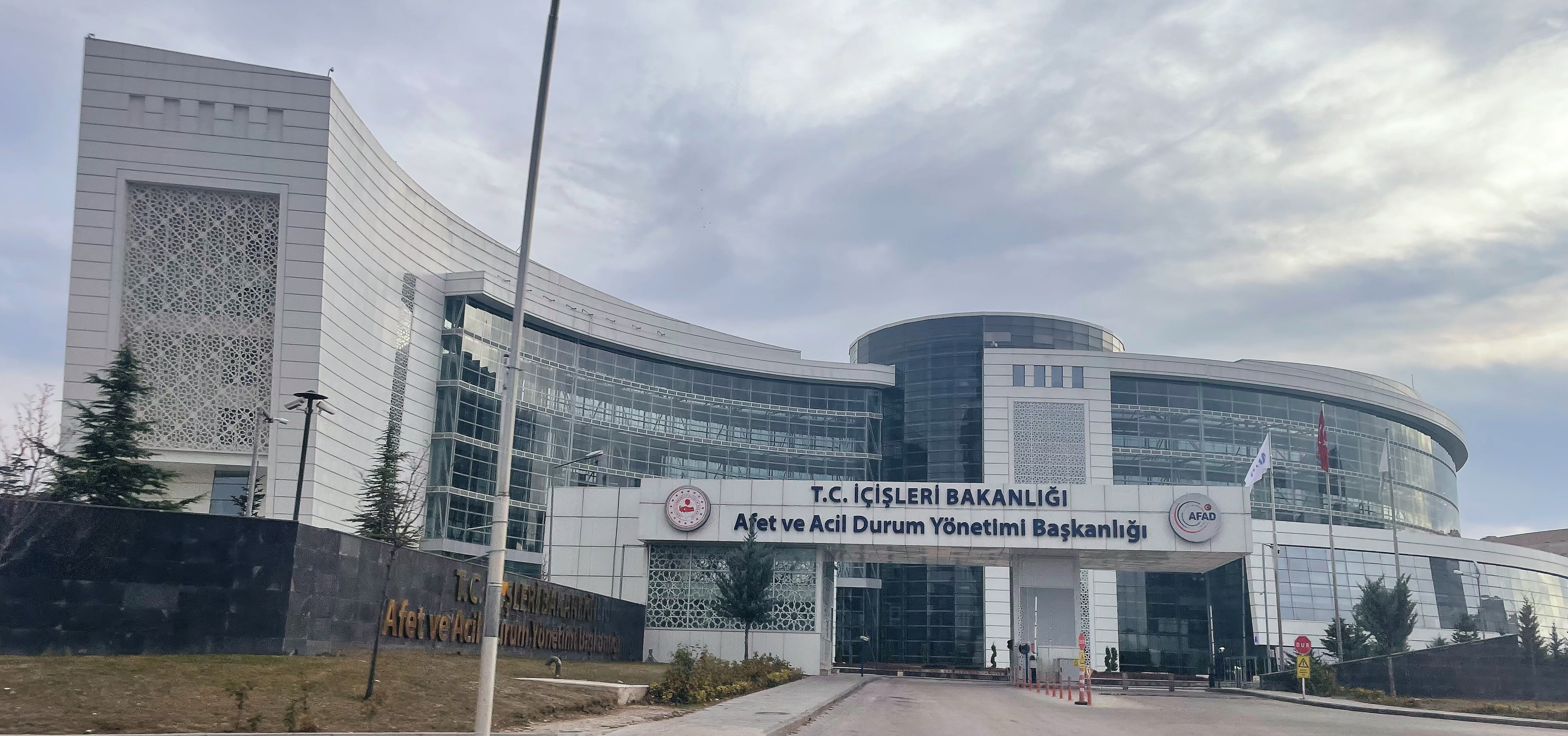
Disaster and Emergency Management Presidency established in order to prepare for future events.

A massive international response was mounted to assist in digging for survivors and to assist the wounded and homeless. Rescue teams were dispatched within 24–48 hours of the disaster, and the assistance to the survivors was channeled through NGOs, Turkish Red Crescent and local search and rescue organizations.

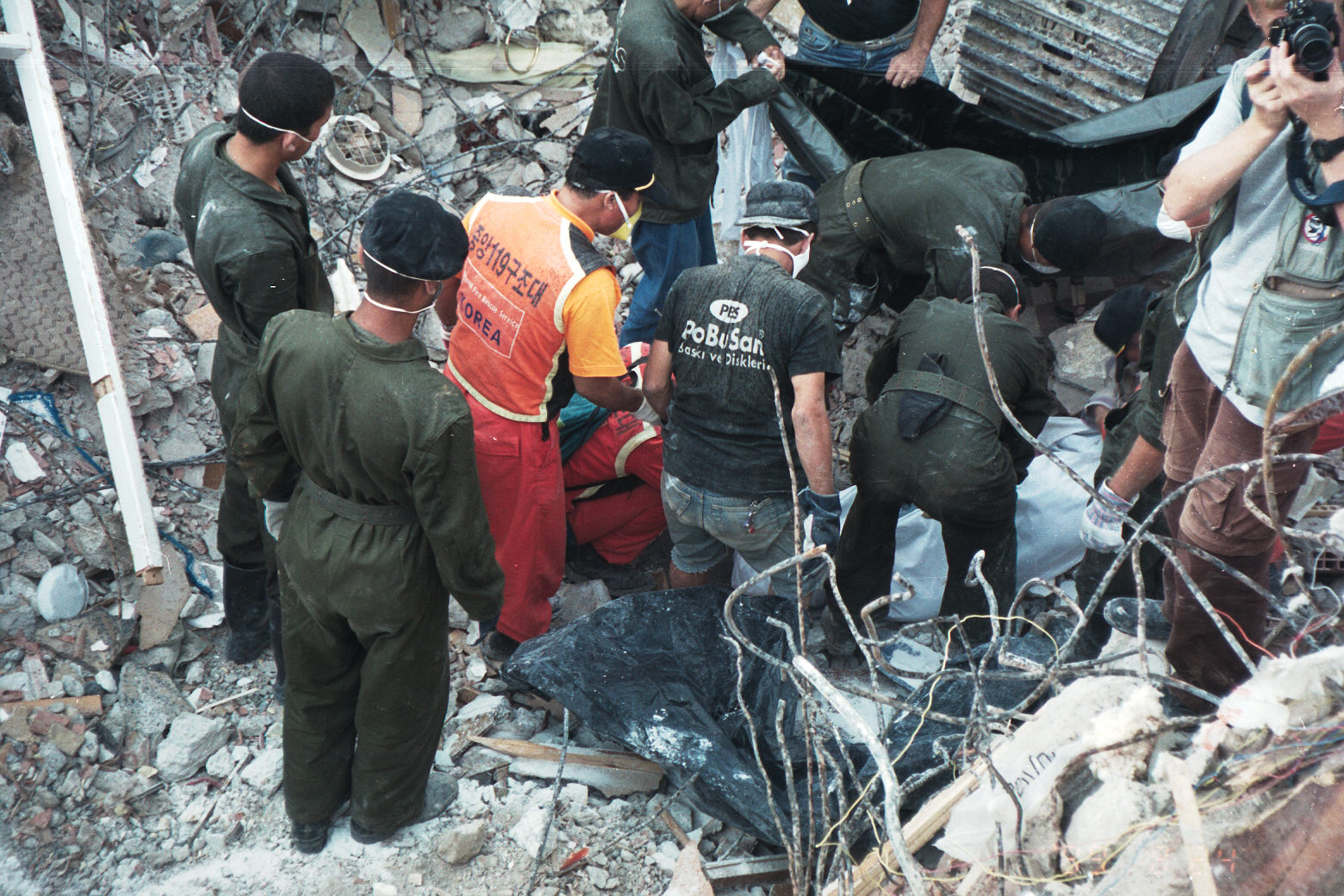
A team of South Korean volunteers and locals helping with rescue operations

The following table shows the breakdown of rescue teams by country in the affected locations:

Location	Foreign search and rescue teams
Gölcük, Kocaeli	Hungary, Israel, France, South Korea, Belgium, Russia
Yalova	Germany, Hungary, Israel, Poland, United Kingdom, France, Japan, Austria, Romania, South Korea
Avcılar, Istanbul	Greece, Germany
İzmit, Kocaeli	Russia, Hungary, France, Germany, Austria, Switzerland, United States, Iceland, South Korea, Ukraine
Sakarya	Bulgaria, Egypt, Germany, Spain
Düzce	Poland, United Kingdom
Bayrampaşa, Istanbul	Italy
Kartal, Istanbul	Azerbaijan

Search and Rescue Effort as of 19 August 1999. Source: USAID

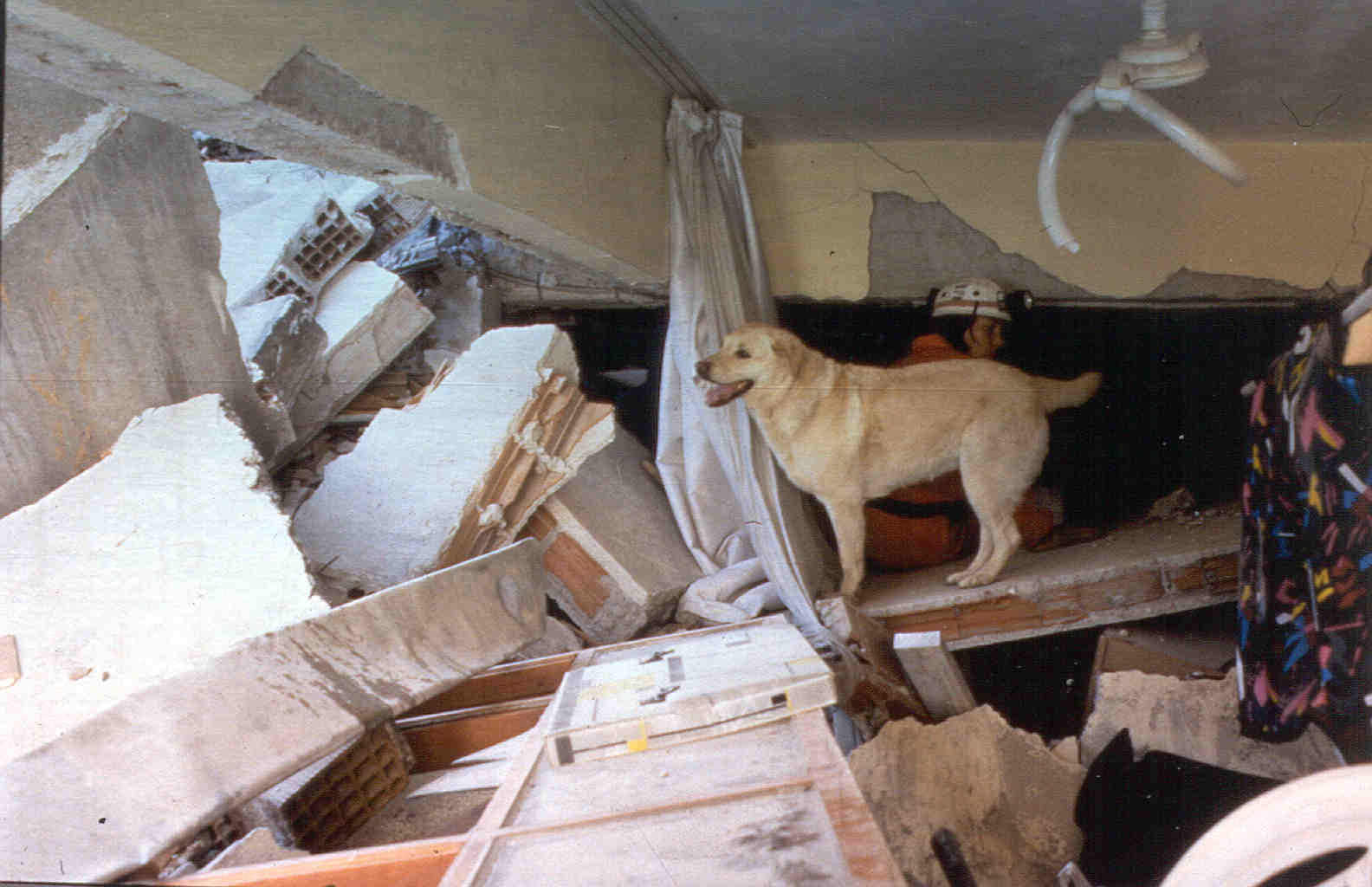
A rescue dog in action

In total, teams from 21 countries (Germany, France, United Kingdom, United States, Israel, Greece, Japan, Austria, Switzerland, Hungary, Russia, South Korea, Belgium, Poland, Romania, Bulgaria, Egypt, Spain, Italy, Azerbaijan, and Iceland), assisted in the rescue effort. Greece was the first nation to pledge aid and support. Within hours of the earthquake, the Greek Ministry of Foreign Affairs contacted their counterparts in Turkey, and the minister sent his personal envoys. The Greek Ministry of Public Orders sent a rescue team of 24 people and two trained rescue dogs, as well as fire-extinguishing planes to help put out the fire in the Tüpraş Oil refinery.

Oil Spill Response Limited was activated by BP and deployed from the United Kingdom to the Tüpraş Refinery. Responders successfully contained the previously uncontrolled discharge of oil from the site into the sea.

The UK announced an immediate grant of £50,000 to help the Turkish Red Crescent, while the International Red Cross and Red Crescent pledged £4.5 million to help victims. Blankets, medical supplies and food were flown from Stansted airport. Engineers from Thames Water went to help restore water supplies.

US President Bill Clinton later visited Istanbul and İzmit to examine the level of destruction and meet with the survivors. The US dispatched military units to Turkey such as the 26th Marine Expeditionary Unit under the name Operation Avid Response.

== Aftermath ==
The catastrophic loss of life due to the two earthquakes in 1999 (the other being 1999 Düzce earthquake), largely attributed to poor construction practices and building code violations, sparked a national outcry in Turkey. In the aftermath of the disaster, legal proceedings were initiated against contractors whose substandard work directly contributed to the collapses. Several prominent businessmen, including Veli Göçer and Hamza Cebeci, were tried, convicted of negligent homicide, and sentenced to prison. for their roles in the collapse of poorly constructed buildings. Responding to the public outrage and the systemic failures exposed by the disaster, the Ecevit government subsequently passed reforms designed to improve construction quality and enforce stricter building standards.

== Future risk ==
There has been an increased seismic activity in the Eastern Sea of Marmara since 2002 and a quiescence of earthquakes on the Princes' Islands Segment of the North Anatolian Fault off the southern coast of Istanbul. This suggests that the 150 km (93 mi) long submarine seismic gap below the Sea of Marmara could result in another large earthquake. These possibilities are quite important, with respect to the segmentation of major fault ruptures along the North Anatolian Fault Zone in north-western Turkey. With the possible activation of segments towards the metropolitan areas of Istanbul, the Princes' Islands gap should be considered to have an impact on the large seismic hazard potential for Istanbul.

Despite a long-term earthquake catalogue existing for the North Anatolian Fault Zone and for the Istanbul area in particular, the basic understanding of the seismicity there is still lacking. The observation of a seismic gap in the vicinity of the Istanbul metropolitan area was made possible through deploying a dense network of seismic stations and small arrays near the fault trace, south of the Princes' Islands. This improved monitoring along the Princes' Islands segment, which is west of the İzmit 1999 rupture and southeast of Istanbul's city center. It has highlighted the location of likely rupture points for future earthquake. It also limits the maximum size of future events along the whole Marmara seismic gap in case of cascade behavior. Knowing this, a regional earthquake early warning system for Istanbul and surroundings could be beneficial. The aseismic part of the Princes' Islands segment represents a likely high-slip area for a future large earthquake. Fault characterization is likewise very relevant to determine the directivity of earthquake waves approaching Istanbul. Modelling of potential impacts to Istanbul from different scenarios have shown to improve the estimation of hazards that the seismic gaps pose. Improved and denser seismic monitoring is expected from on-going efforts to install an underground (borehole-based) seismograph network in the Sea of Marmara.

Istanbul, being the most populated city in Turkey, lies right near the segments of the North Anatolian Fault Zone, making it at very high risk to an earthquake-related disaster which could cause thousands of casualties and severe damage. Following the 1999 earthquake, there was an urgent need for the government to mitigate these risks. With the help of organizations like the World Bank, hundreds of buildings have been retrofitted and reconstructed, and thousands of citizens have been trained in disaster preparedness.

== Gallery ==
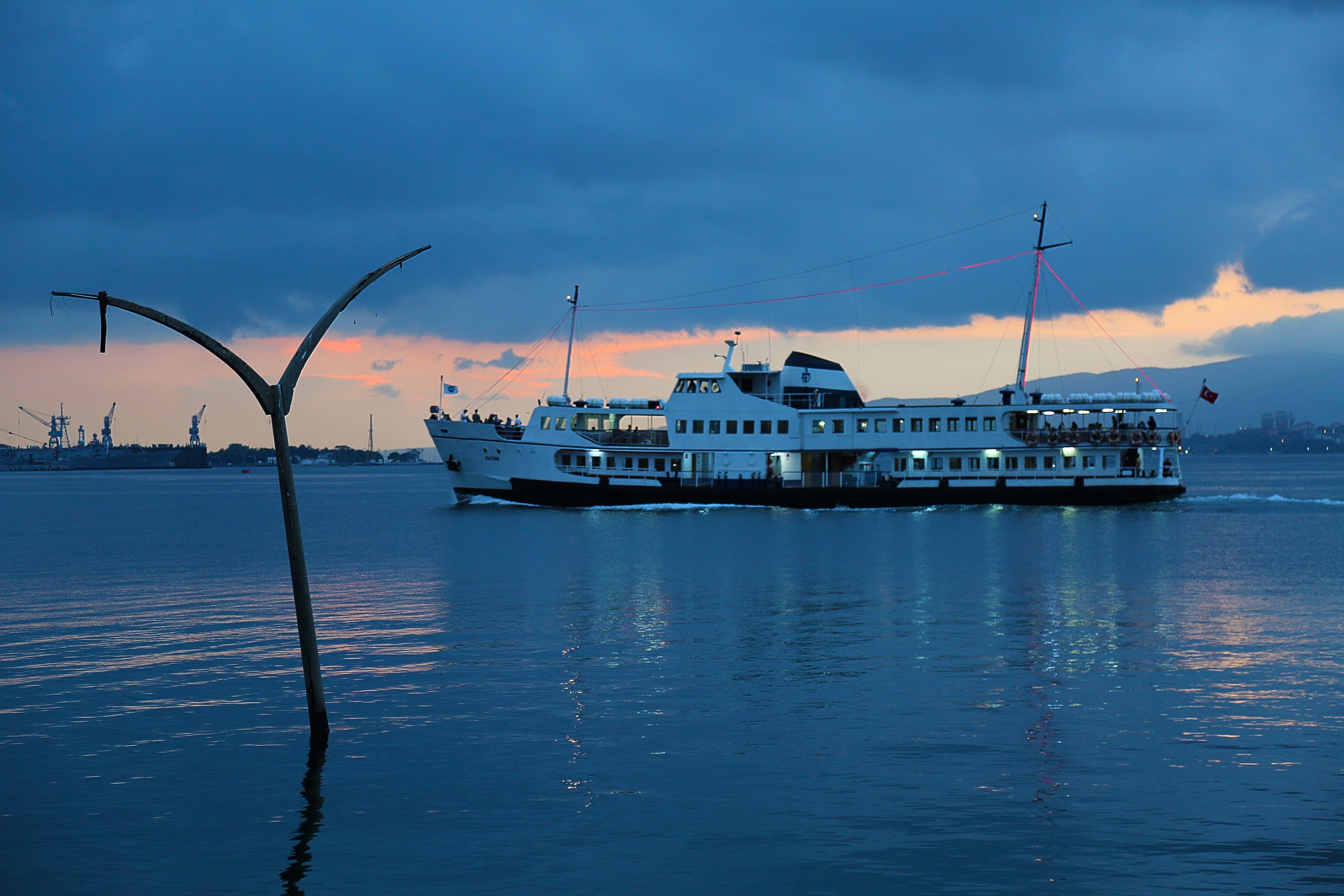
Flooded Kavaklı Beach in Gölcük

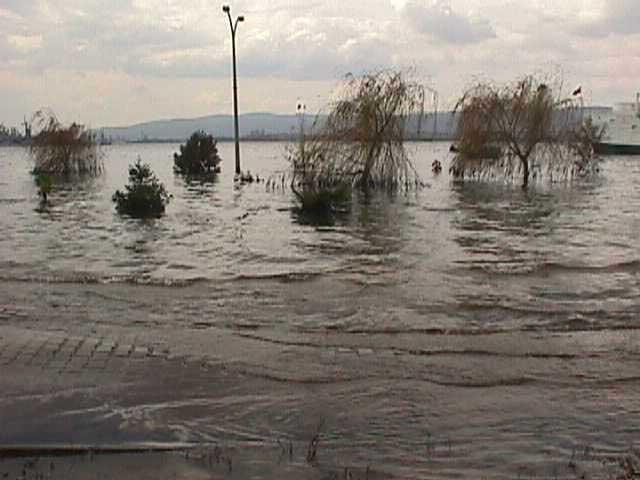
Tsunami wave causing minor surge

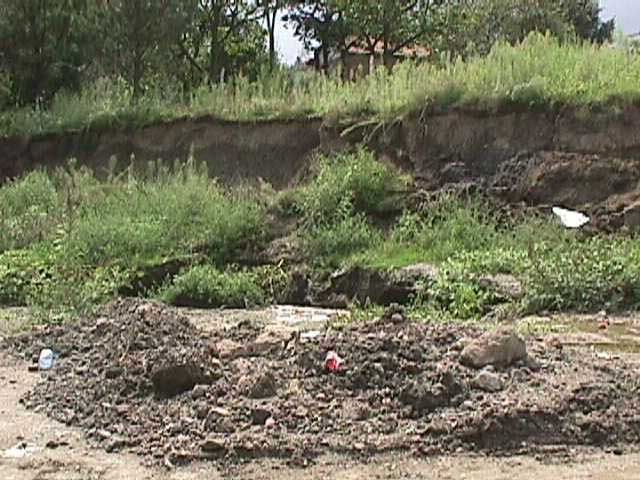
Fault scarp as a result of the earthquake

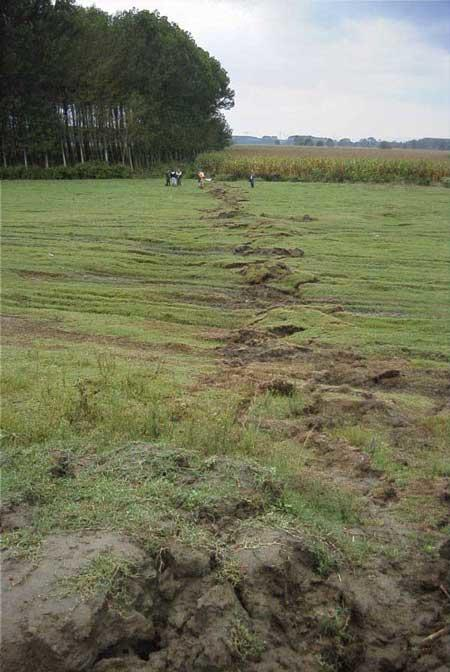
Surface rupture in Sakarya

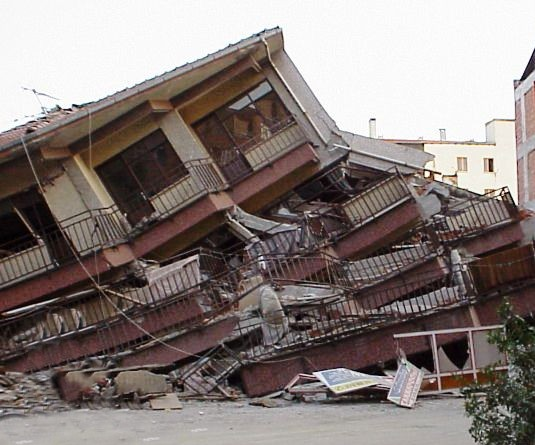
Collapsed building

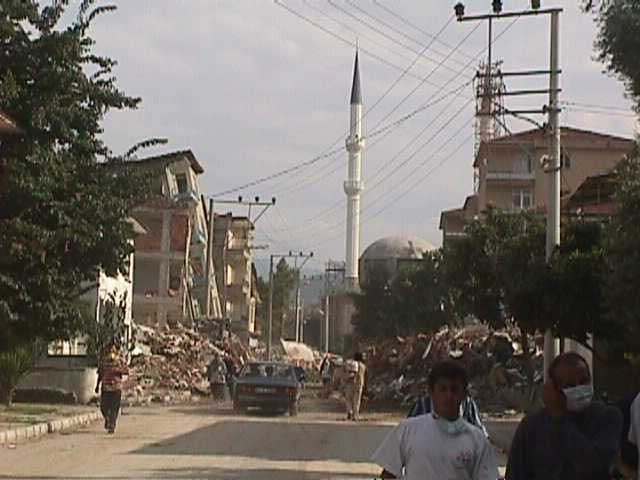
Destroyed buildings along a street

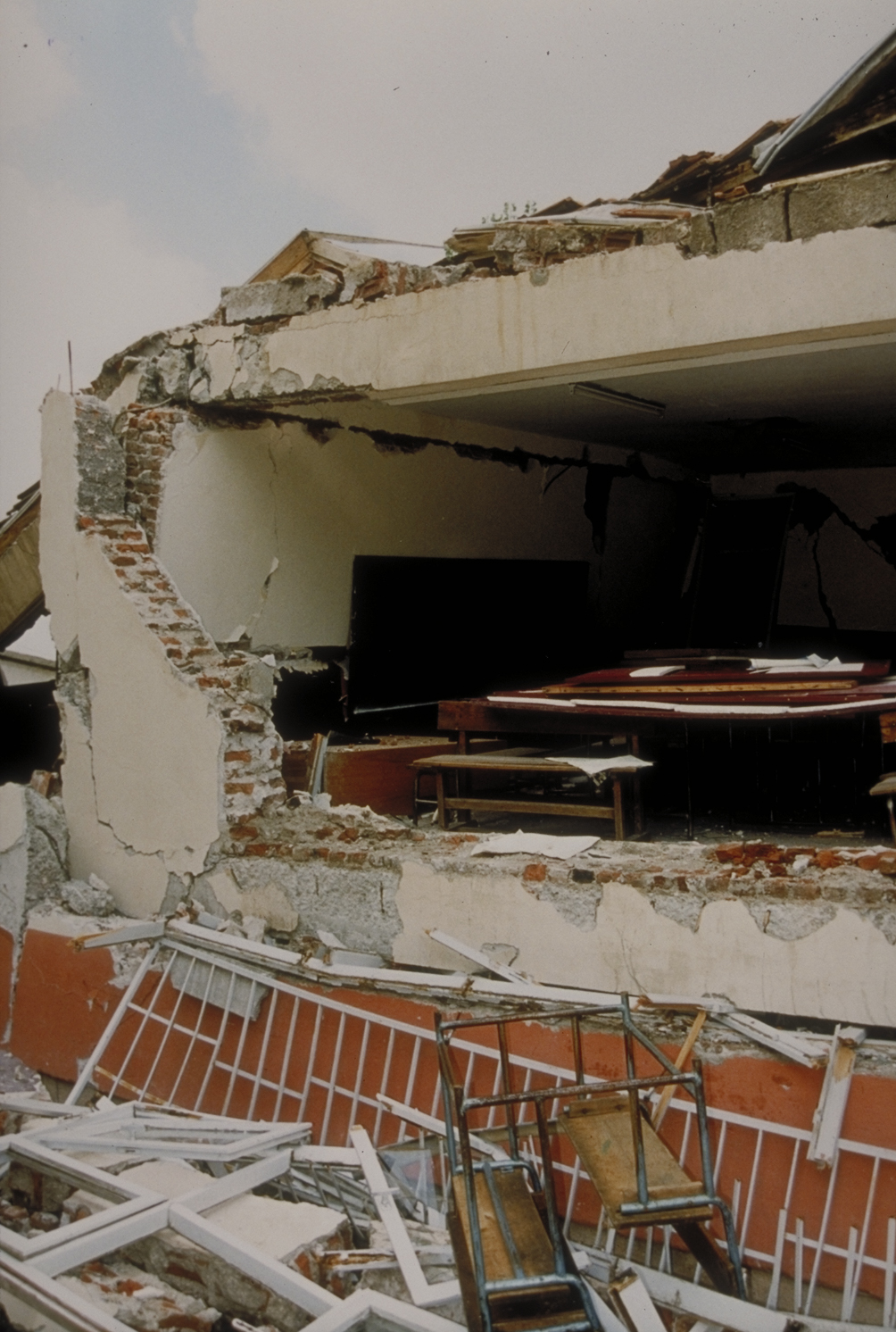
Classroom where the fault rupture went right under it

== See also ==
- 1999 Düzce earthquake
- List of earthquakes in 1999
- List of earthquakes in Turkey
- Yalova Earthquake Monument
- 2022 Düzce earthquake
- 2023 Turkey–Syria earthquakes
