= North Anatolian Fault =

Turkish seismic strike-slip fault

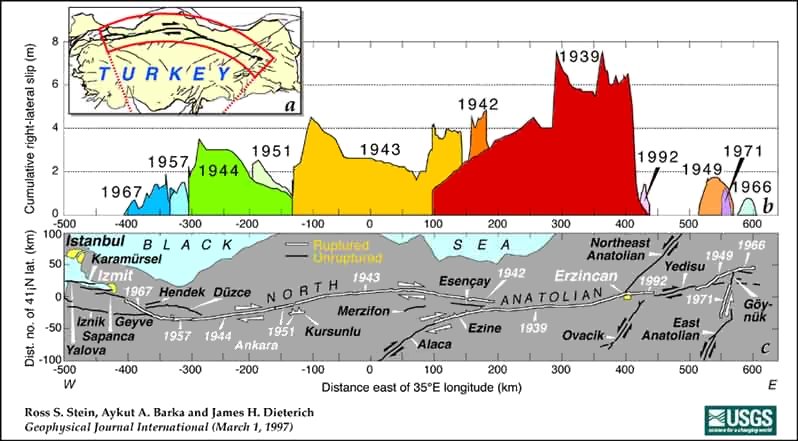
- The North Anatolian Fault and slip magnitudes of earthquakes in the 20th century

- The North Anatolian and neighbouring faults covering most of Turkey
- Coordinates: 41°00′N 35°00′E
- Country: Turkey
- Region: Marmara region, Black Sea Region, Eastern Anatolia region
- Cities: Istanbul, Bursa, Kocaeli, Bolu, Tokat, Erzincan, Erzurum

Characteristics
- Elevation: 3,937 metres (12,917 ft)
- Top depth: 1,370 metres (4,495 ft)
- Range: Pontic Mountains, Köroğlu Mountains
- Length: 1,500 kilometres (900 mi)
- Strike: E-W

Tectonics
- Plate: Anatolian sub-plate, Eurasian plate
- Status: Active
- Earthquakes: List of earthquakes in Turkey
- Type: strike-slip fault

The North Anatolian Fault (NAF; Turkish: Kuzey Anadolu Fay Hattı) is an active right-lateral strike-slip fault in northern Anatolia, and is the transform boundary between the Eurasian plate and the Anatolian sub-plate. The fault extends westward from a junction with the East Anatolian Fault at the Karliova triple junction in eastern Turkey, across northern Turkey and into the Aegean Sea for a length of 1200−1500 kilometers. GPS measurements show the slip rate along its eastern part increasing westward from about 16 to 24 mm (0.6 to 0.9 in) per year, and the GEM Global Active Faults database assigns its mapped sections rates of up to about 25 mm per year. It runs about 20 km south of Istanbul. The North Anatolian Fault is similar in many ways to the San Andreas Fault in California. Both are continental transforms with similar lengths and slip rates. The Sea of Marmara near Istanbul is an extensional basin similar to the Salton Trough in California, where a releasing bend in the strike slip system creates a pull-apart basin.

== Fault geometry and segmentation ==
The North Anatolian Fault is a mature, linear plate boundary, but its trace is not continuous. Instead, it is divided into a series of distinct fault segments separated by structural complexities such as step-overs, fault jogs, and bends. These geometric irregularities act as barriers that regulate the nucleation, propagation, and termination of large seismic ruptures along the fault system.

=== Releasing step-overs and rupture barriers ===
During large strike-slip earthquakes, dynamic ruptures propagate along individual segments but can be stopped or delayed when they encounter step-overs. Empirical observations and dynamic modeling along the fault indicate a critical step-over width of approximately 3 to 4 kilometers:

- Rupture propagation: Releasing step-overs with a width of less than 2 km are typically bypassed. During the 1999 Izmit earthquake, the dynamic rupture successfully jumped across the 1-to-2-km-wide Sapanca step-over to propagate from the Sapanca segment onto the Sakarya segment.
- Rupture arrest: Releasing step-overs wider than 4 km act as highly effective physical barriers. In the same 1999 event, the westward-propagating rupture was completely arrested by the 4-to-5-km-wide Karamürsel step-over basin, preventing the rupture from jumping onto the Yalova segment further west.

=== Multisegment ruptures ===
While individual segments of 30 to 100 kilometers in length often control smaller earthquakes, major seismic events on the fault typically involve multisegment ruptures that break through multiple geometric barriers. For example, the 1944 Bolu-Gerede earthquake ruptured approximately 180 km of the fault, breaking through five distinct structural segments (the Bolu, Yeniçağa, Gerede, İsmetpaşa, and Bayramören segments) separated by minor bends and jogs.

== Significant earthquakes ==
Since the disastrous 1939 Erzincan earthquake, there have been seven earthquakes measuring over 7.0 in magnitude, each happening at a point progressively further west. Seismologists studying this pattern believe that each earthquake may trigger the next. By analyzing the stresses along the fault caused by each large earthquake, they were able to predict the shock that hit the town of İzmit with devastating effect in August 1999. It is thought that the chain is not complete, and that an earthquake will soon strike further west along the fault – perhaps near the heavily populated city of Istanbul.

Event	Moment magnitude	Casualties
1929 Suşehri	6.3	64 dead
1939 Erzincan	7.8	32,700+ dead and 100,000+ injured
1942 Niksar–Erbaa	7.0	~3,000 dead
1943 Tosya–Ladik	7.2	2,824 dead
1944 Bolu–Gerede	7.2	3,959 dead
1949 Karlıova	6.7	320 dead
1951 Kurşunlu	6.9	50 dead and 3,354 injured
1957 Abant	7.1	52 dead
1966 Varto	6.9	2,394 dead and 1,489 injured
1967 Mudurnu Valley	7.1	86 dead, 332 injured
1992 Erzincan	6.7	498+ dead and 2,000+ injured
1999 İzmit	7.6	18,373 dead and 43,953+ injured
1999 Düzce	7.2	845+ dead and 4,948 injured
2022 Düzce	6.1	2 dead and 93 injured
2025 Sea of Marmara	6.2	1 dead, 165 injured
