= 1898 =

1898 in various calendars
- Gregorian calendar: 1898; MDCCCXCVIII
- Ab urbe condita: 2651
- Armenian calendar: 1347; ԹՎ ՌՅԽԷ
- Assyrian calendar: 6648
- Baháʼí calendar: 54–55
- Balinese saka calendar: 1819–1820
- Bengali calendar: 1304–1305
- Berber calendar: 2848
- British Regnal year: 61 Vict. 1 – 62 Vict. 1
- Buddhist calendar: 2442
- Burmese calendar: 1260
- Byzantine calendar: 7406–7407
- Chinese calendar: 丁酉年 (Fire Rooster); 4595 or 4388 — to — 戊戌年 (Earth Dog); 4596 or 4389
- Coptic calendar: 1614–1615
- Discordian calendar: 3064
- Ethiopian calendar: 1890–1891
- Hebrew calendar: 5658–5659
- Hindu calendars
- Vikram Samvat: 1954–1955
- Shaka Samvat: 1819–1820
- Kali Yuga: 4998–4999
- Holocene calendar: 11898
- Igbo calendar: 898–899
- Iranian calendar: 1276–1277
- Islamic calendar: 1315–1316
- Japanese calendar: Meiji 31 (明治３１年)
- Javanese calendar: 1827–1828
- Julian calendar: Gregorian minus 12 days
- Korean calendar: 4231
- Minguo calendar: 14 before ROC 民前14年
- Nanakshahi calendar: 430
- Thai solar calendar: 2440–2441
- Tibetan calendar: མེ་མོ་བྱ་ལོ་ (female Fire-Bird); 2024 or 1643 or 871 — to — ས་ཕོ་ཁྱི་ལོ་ (male Earth-Dog); 2025 or 1644 or 872

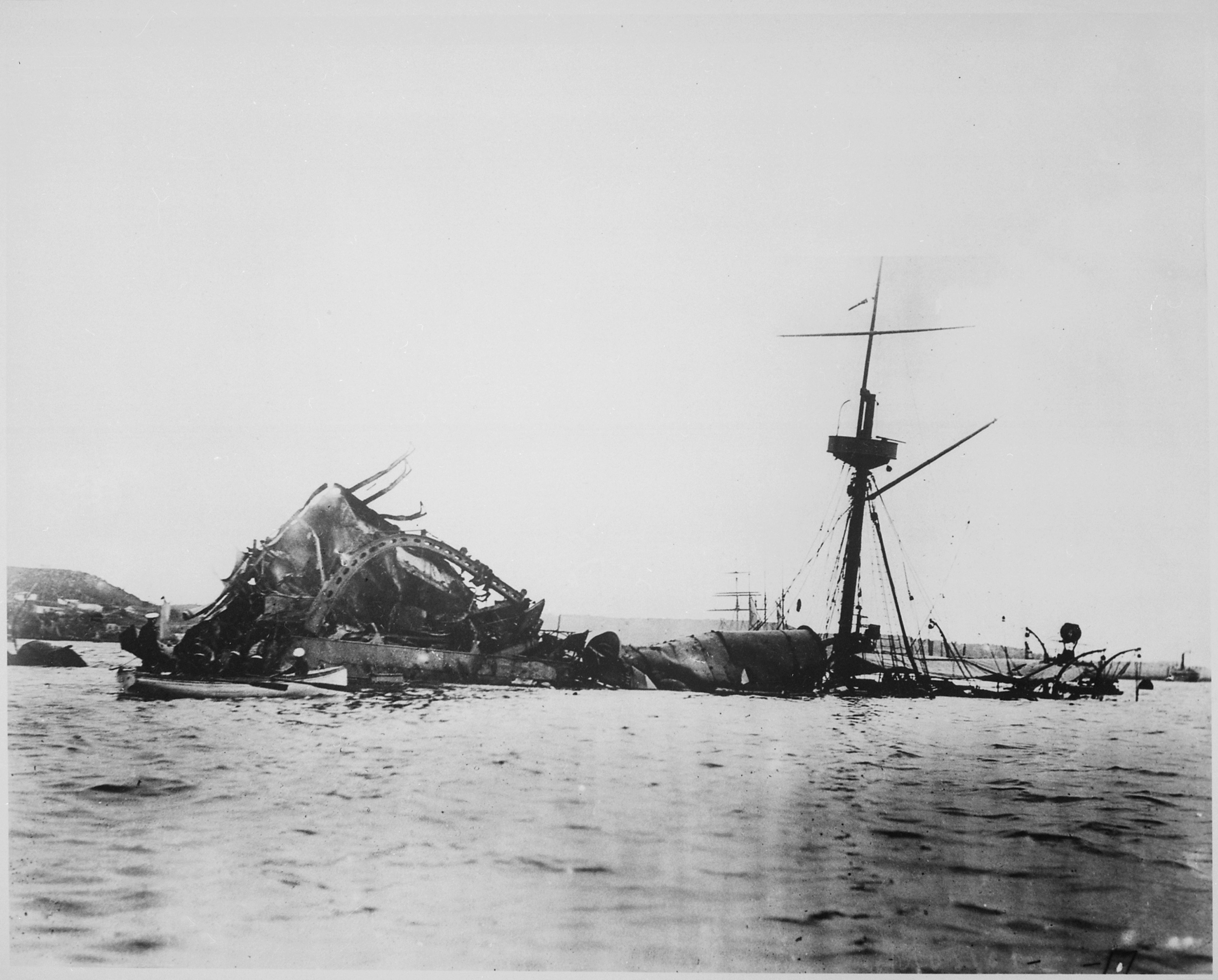
February 15: The American warship USS Maine is destroyed in Spanish-controlled Havana Harbor, killing 266 men and leading to the Spanish-American War

1898 (MDCCCXCVIII) was a common year starting on Saturday of the Gregorian calendar and a common year starting on Thursday of the Julian calendar, the 1898th year of the Common Era (CE) and Anno Domini (AD) designations, the 898th year of the 2nd millennium, the 98th year of the 19th century, and the 9th year of the 1890s decade. As of the start of 1898, the Gregorian calendar was 12 days ahead of the Julian calendar, which remained in localized use until 1923.

== Events ==
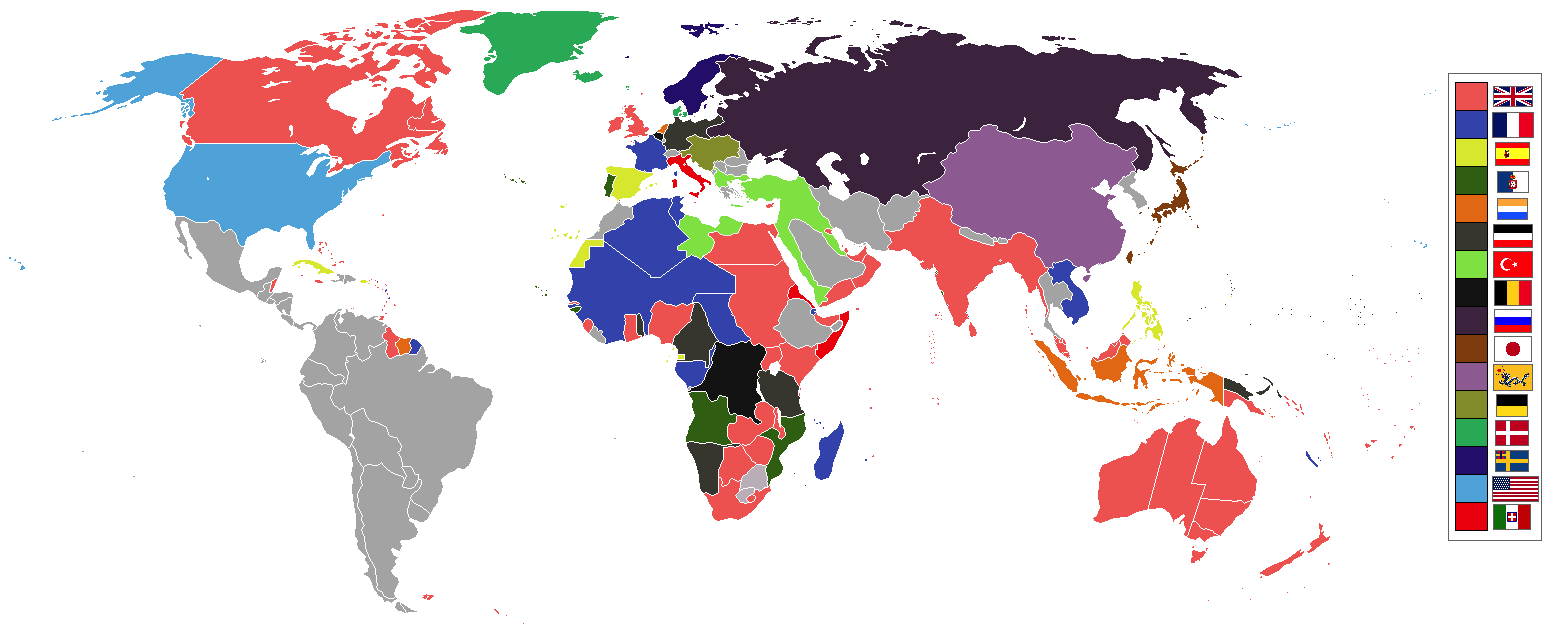
1898 world map

=== January ===
- January 1 –
  - New York City annexes land from surrounding counties, creating the world's second most populated city. The city, initially called the City of Greater New York, is geographically divided into five boroughs: Manhattan, Brooklyn, Queens, The Bronx and Staten Island. Robert Anderson Van Wyck, from Manhattan borough, becomes the new city's first Mayor.
  - The provisional government of the Republic of Chile is inaugurated.
- January 2 – The flooding of an underground mine at San Puerta, near Guanajuta in Mexico kills 35 miners.
- January 3 – Several people are killed in the Canadian city of London, Ontario when the floor collapses in a gallery.
- January 4 –
  - The Paul M. Potter theater production The Conquerors premieres on Broadway at the Empire Theatre, but its initial showing is unpopular and described in one newspaper as "a deliberate endeavor to pander to debased tastes."
  - Two horse-drawn streetcar lines in Ghent, Belgium, are merged to for SA des Tramways Electriques de Gand in a switch to trams with electric motors.
- January 5 – China and Germany come to an agreement on the cession of Chinese territory at Kiao-Chau Bay to German control.
- January 6 – In the Moluccas, the town of Ambon is destroyed by an earthquake that kills 126 people.
- January 7 – The six leading U.S. manufacturers of steel agree publicly to an increase, by one dollar per ton, for steel beams.
- January 8 – Near Maud, Oklahoma, two Seminole Indian men, Lincoln McGeisey and Palmer Sampson, are burned alive by a lynch mob after being accused of murdering a white woman, Mary Leard, on December 30.
- January 9 – In Malaysia, the British North Borneo Chartered Company successfully attacks a fort at Ranau with a mission of ending the Mat Salleh Rebellion by capturing Mat Salleh and his followers, but finds that the rebels had abandoned the fort and moved to a more secure location in the interior of Tamburan.
- January 10 – The trial begins for Ferdinand Esterhazy, an officer in the French Army accused of spying for the German Empire and for committing treason for which Captain Alfred Dreyfus was wrongfully convicted in 1894. Esterhazy is acquitted the next day in proceedings closed to the public.
- January 11 –
  - Li Hongzhang (Li Hung Chang) returns to office as the Grand Secretary of China, similar to a Prime Minister of China.
  - Voters in the U.S. state of Louisiana approve a constitutional convention to debate the disenfranchising of illiterate African-Americans, without affecting the rights of illiterate White voters.
- January 12 –
  - An official investigation implicates Vice-President Pereira of Brazil, and 20 other people from the military and the congress, in a conspiracy to assassinate President Prudente de Morais.
  - The Marquis Itō Hirobumi organizes a new government as Prime Minister of Japan, succeeding Matsukata Masayoshi.
- January 13 – Novelist Émile Zola's open letter to the President of the French Republic on the Dreyfus affair, J'Accuse…!, is published on the front page of the Paris daily newspaper L'Aurore, accusing the government of wrongfully imprisoning Alfred Dreyfus and of antisemitism.
- January 14 – U.S. Senator Samuel Hoar of Massachusetts introduces a bill proposing an amendment to postpone the presidential inauguration day from March 4 to April 30.
- January 15 –
  - Ugandan monarch and rebel Mwanga II of Buganda is defeated by British colonial authorities after having made an attempt to regain the throne which he lost on August 9, 1897.
  - Walter Eli Clark is appointed as the Governor of the U.S. District of Alaska by President McKinley.
- January 16 – Charles Pelham Villiers, who represented Wolverhampton in the British House of Commons since 1835, dies in office 10 days after having celebrated 63 consecutive years as Member of Parliament, a record that continues to stand more than 130 years later.
- January 17 – President Sanford B. Dole of the Republic of Hawaii arrives in the U.S. on an official tour and to meet with Congressional officials about U.S. annexation of the Republic
- January 18 – British colonial engineer and estate manager William Claxton Peppé discovers the Buddha's remains in Piprahwa, Uttar Pradesh, India.
- January 19 –
  - An expedition led by French officer Marius Gabriel Cazemajou in Africa accomplishes the securing of a French protectorate over the Kebbi Emirate in Niger, as well as Kebbi's tributary chiefdoms of the Dendi, Maouri and Djerma people.
  - The longest running college ice hockey rivalry, between Harvard University and Brown University, begins as Brown defeats Harvard, 6 goals to 0.
- January 20 – Delegations from multiple British colonies in Australia being a convention to discuss a federation of the governments into a single British Commonwealth.
- January 21 – Joseph McKenna is confirmed as an Associate Justice of the U.S. Supreme Court by a voice vote in the U.S. Senate, and takes his seat on the bench five days later.
- January 22 –
  - A total eclipse of the Sun is observed throughout British India.
  - Fighting between members of the French Chamber of Deputies breaks out during a debate on the Alfred Dreyfus case.
- January 23 – Violent anti-Jewish riots break out in the French Algerian capital, Algiers.
- January 24 – Two days after suspending operations because of rioting in Paris out of the Dreyfus case, the French Chamber of Deputies votes confidence in the French government by a margin of 376 to 133.
- January 25 – The editor of the German humor magazine Kladderadatsch is sentenced to two months in prison for publishing a cartoon that insulted Kaiser Wilhelm II.
- January 26 –
  - The United Mine Workers of America labor union and representatives of U.S. bituminous coal companies in Pennsylvania, Ohio and Indiana, agree to a uniform eight-hour workday, effective April 1, 1898, with a 10 cent per ton increase in wages.
  - President Dole of Hawaii is welcomed in Washington, D.C. as a guest of U.S. President William McKinley.
- January 27 –
  - Nineteen days before the destruction of the battleship USS Maine, an investigative report to the U.S. Secretary of the Navy warns that in ships where the coal bunker is stored next to the artillery magazines, there is a danger that if the coal is overheated and spontaneously catches fire, the magazines are at a risk of exploding.
  - The Banca per il Trentino-Alto Adige, now the main component of Italy's Gruppo Cassa Centrale Banca, is founded in the Italian city of Trento.
- January 28 –
  - The Fire Department of the City of New York (FDNY) is expanded with the merger of the existing department with the Brooklyn Fire Department and the Long Island City Fire Department
  - Indian independence activist and self-proclaimed prophet Birsa Munda is released from prison in British India after two years and returns to the Bengal Province to reorganize his followers.
  - The only known bones of the dinosaur species "Capitalsaurus", originally referred to as "Creosaurus" and "Dryptosaurus", are discovered by construction workers excavating a sewer at the intersection of Washington, D.C.'s First Street and F Street SE.
- January 29 –
  - The Deutscher Leichtathletik-Verband (DLV), Germany's governing body for the sport of track and field (athletics), is established in Darmstadt.
  - A 7.0 magnitude earthquake strikes the city of Balıkesir in the Ottoman Empire (now Turkey) and kills around 500 people.
  - Frank Childs knocks out Bob Armstrong to become the new World Colored Heavyweight boxing champion.
- January 30 –
  - The first complete organized baseball game in Puerto Rico (at the time, a colony of Spain) is played, as the Puerto Rican team Borinquen defeats Alemendares, a team of Cuban and Puerto Rican players, 9 to 3 in a game at Santurce. The two teams had played an incomplete game on January 11 with Borinquen ahead 3 to 0 before the game ended.
  - The elliptical galaxy IC 3370, located at least 156 million light years from Earth, is discovered by American astronomer Lewis A. Swift in the area of the sky occupied by the constellation Centaurus.
- January 31 – Nineteen people are drowned when the British mail packet ship Channel Queen is wrecked off of the British island of Guernsey.

=== February ===
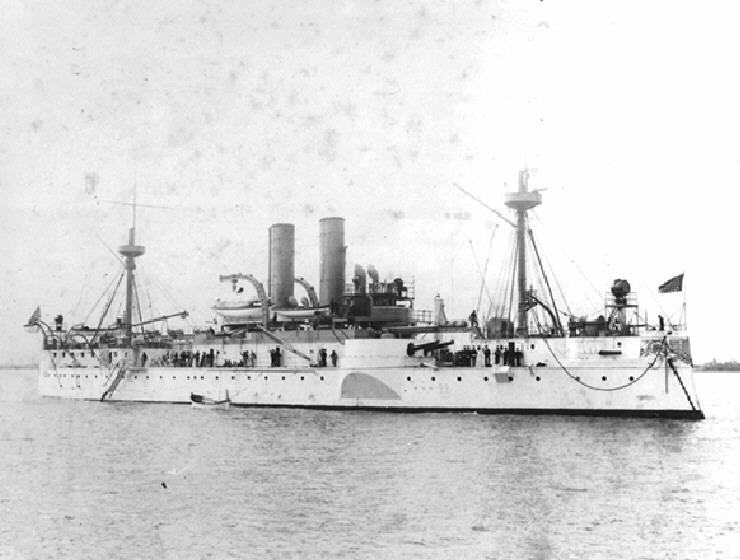
USS Maine before its sinking

- February 1 –
  - The Red Tuesday bushfires break out in the Australian town of Gippsland, Victoria, destroying 2,000 buildings, killing 12 people and leaving 2,500 others homeless.
  - The electoral college of Colombia meets to select a new president, after voters had selected the electors on December 5. Of the 2,045 members, 1,606 or more than 78% vote for Manuel Antonio Sanclemente of the Partido Nacional.
  - The Passion Play of Oberammergau, the first motion picture licensed under Thomas Edison's system, premieres at the Eden Musee theater in New York City. While the promoters claim that the 19-minute film had been made in Oberammergau in Germany, investigative reporters later find that the film had been made on the rooftop of the Grand Central Palace in New York City.
- February 2 – The Kingdom of Prussia forbids the importation of fruit from the United States because of sanitary concerns.
- February 4 –
  - The office of the U.S. Ambassador to Russia is created as the existing Minister to Russia has his position upgraded.
  - The Lake Shore and Michigan Southern Railway is acquired by the New York Central and Hudson River Railroad.
  - In a battle in the Spanish colony of the Philippines, three Spanish Navy gunboats shell and destroy the Moro rebels' villages of Bonto, Buaya, Ragayan, Minbalay and Macro, and 32 Moros are killed.
  - The city of San Martín de los Andes is founded in Argentina as part of a claim over Chilean territory, and later becomes an Argentine tourist destination.
- February 5 –
  - The sinking of the passenger steamer Clara Nevada in Lynn Canal of Alaska kills all 33 people (12 passengers and 21 crew) on board.
  - A relief expedition for gold prospectors stranded in the Klondike in Canada departs from Portland, Oregon.
- February 6 – In the All-Ireland Football Championship of Gaelic football, Limerick defeats Dublin, 1-5 to 0-7, equivalent to an 8 to 7 win, in a match at Dublin before 3,500 people.
- February 7 – The trial of Emile Zola by the French government begins in Paris.
- February 8 –
  - José María Reina Barrios, President of Guatemala, is assassinated by Edgar Zollinger, a British businessman who shoots Reina Barrios with a .38 caliber revolver. Vice President Manuel Estrada Cabrera then takes office as president.
  - Enrique Dupuy de Lôme, Spain's minister to the United States, resigns after his letter criticizing President McKinley is published. Luis Polo de Bernabé is appointed to succeed Dupuy de Lome.
  - The United Kingdom's Parliament is opened with the reading of a speech approved by Queen Victoria.
- Paul Kruger is re-elected as President of the South African Republic.
- February 9 – A warehouse fire in Pittsburgh, Pennsylvania kills 18 people.
- February 10 – The Autonomy Charter of Puerto Rico, approved on November 25, 1897, goes into effect, with Spain granting limited self-government to its colony at the island of Puerto Rico.
- February 11 –
  - The first U.S. Embassy in Russia is established in Saint Petersburg with Ethan Hitchcock as ambassador to the Russian Empire.
  - The spiral galaxy IC 2163, which is in collision with NGC 2207 as part of the "Cosmic Owl" pairing and which is 80 million light-years from Earth is discovered by British astronomer Herbert Alonzo Howe in the region of the constellation Canis Major
- February 12 –
  - An automobile belonging to Henry Lindfield of Brighton rolls out of control down a hill in Purley, London, England, and hits a tree, killing Lindfield and making him the world's first fatality from an automobile accident on a public highway.
  - Francis Hagerup, the Prime Minister of Norway resigns along with his cabinet.
- February 13 –
  - The comic strip Casey's Corner, created by Richard F. Outcault and notable for being the first newspaper comic strip to feature continuity and a story line, as well as focusing on African-American characters, makes its debut in the New York World before moving to the New York Evening Journal two months later.
  - The Australian ship Amy is wrecked at Thiroul, New South Wales, during a cyclone and her crew of 8 all drown, while six of the eight crew of the French fishing boat Gazelle are killed when the vessel is struck by the British ship SS Columbia in the English Channel.
- February 15 – Spanish–American War: The USS Maine explodes and sinks in Havana Harbor, Cuba, for reasons never fully established, killing 266 men. The event precipitates the United States' declaration of war on Spain two months later.
- February 16 – the French ocean liner Flachat sinks off of the coast of Tenerife in the Canary Islands, killing 49 passengers and 38 crew.
- February 19 – The U.S. Department of the Navy declines a request by Spanish officials in Cuba to allow a joint investigation of the explosion of the USS Maine.
- February 20 – In a referendum, voters in Switzerland approve a measure to allow the federation government to nationalize the nation's railroads.
- February 22 –
  - A mob in Lake City, South Carolina, sets fire to the home of the city's African-American postmaster, F.C. Baker, killing him and his infant son, and seriously injuring Baker's wife and two daughters.
  - France's government denies that it has any intention of usurping British territory in Africa.
- February 23 – Émile Zola is sentenced to one year's imprisonment in France fo, after writing J'Accuse…!, an attack on the Esterhazy court-martial, and is fined 3,000 French francs.
- February 24 – The French Chamber of Deputies passes a resolution of confidence in the government of Prime Minister Jules Méline by a large majority.
- February 25 – The Spanish cruiser Vizcaya leaves New York harbor and sails to Havana 10 days after the destruction of the USS Maine.
- February 27 – An unsuccessful assassination attempt is made against King George of Greece.
- February 28 –
  - The U.S. Senate votes, 50 to 19, to deny the seat to which Henry Cornett of Oregon had been elected.
  - Spain's Cortes votes to approve an appropriation of one million Spanish pesetas for the kingdom's navy in the Spanish-American War.
  - Contracts are signed at Beijing for joint British and German loan to China at 4 1/2% interest per annum, with the principal to be paid in full by 1943.

=== March ===
- March 1 – Troops in Costa Rica are ordered to the nation's border with Nicaragua in preparation for a war.
- March 2 – Manoel Ferraz de Campos Sales is elected as President of Brazil and Francisco de Assis Rosa e Silva is elected Vice-President.
- March 5 –
  - Paul Gautsch von Frankenthurn, Chancellor of Austria, resigns along with his cabinet.
  - Spanish authorities in Cuba arrest 19 Cubans on charges of conspiracy against the Spanish colonial government.
  - A fire kills more than 20 coal miners at Breslau in Prussia (now Wroclaw in Poland)
- March 7 –
  - The Empire of China agrees to lease Port Arthur (now Lushunkou) and Talienwan to the Russian Empire for a 99-year term to last until 1997.
  - Count Franz von Thun und Hohenstein forms a new government as Chancellor of Austria at the request of the Emperor Franz Josef.
  - The cabinet of the prime minister of the Korean Empire resigns after the Emperor grants the Deer Island concession to Russia.
- March 8 – -->
- March 9 – U.S. President William McKinley signs the bill appropriating $50,000,000 for national defense for the Spanish-American War immediately after the U.S. Senate approves the measure unanimously. The Houde of Representatives had unanimously approved the bill the day before.
- March 10 – At Zoar, Ohio, the Society of Separatists votes to disband its commune after 50 years of communistic life, and the accumulation of three million dollars of property.
- March 12 – Luis Polo de Bernabé presents his credentials to President McKinley as the new Spanish Minister to the United.States
- March 13 – Vladimir Lenin creates the Russian Social Democratic Labour Party in Minsk.
- March 14 – The association football and sports club BSC Young Boys is established in Bern, Switzerland, as the Fussballclub Young Boys.
- March 16 – In Melbourne the representatives of five colonies adopt a constitution which will become the basis of the Commonwealth of Australia.
- March 18 – An explosion kills at least 75 miners at Belmez in the Cordoba Province of Spain.
- March 21 – Austria's parliament, the Reichsrat, opens its annual session.
- March 23 –
  - The sinking of the Newfoundland steamer Greenland kills all 48 of the crew.
  - By a vote of 207 to 7, the Italian Chamber of Deputies overwhelmingly adopts a resolution recommending political censure of former premier Francesco Crispi for ethics arising from the Banca Romana scandal. Crispi resigns his seat in the Chamber two days later.
- March 24 –
  - Robert Allison of Port Carbon, Pennsylvania, becomes the first person to purchase an American-built motor vehicle, when he buys a Winton automobile that had been advertised in Scientific American.
  - The Banco de España agrees to a 40 million dollar loan to the Spanish government to guarantee payment of war bonds.
  - The Chinese government agrees to all Russian demands in the leasing of Port Arthur and Talienwan.
- March 25 –
  - More than 100 officers of the Imperial Russian Navy's Black Sea Fleet are arrested on charges of bribery and corruption, along with numerous civilian dockyard officials, and Admiral Kopyloff is dismissed.
  - Elections in Britain's Cape Colony in South Africa result in a 40 to 38 majority in the 79-member House of Assembly for the Afrikaner Bond over the Progressive Party.
- March 26 – The Sabie Game Reserve in South Africa is created, as the first officially designated game reserve.
- March 27 – Elections are held in Spain for the seats in the Cortes Generales (160 of the 320 seats in the Senate and all 477 in the Congress of Deputies, and Prime Minister Práxedes Sagasta's Liberal Party retains its majority.
- March 28 – The report of the U.S. Navy Court of Inquiry on the sinking of USS Maineis forwarded to both houses of Congress prior to its public release.
- March 29 – With war looming, Spain's Premier Praxedes Sagasta meets in conference with the U.S. Minister to Spain, Stewart L. Woodford.
- March 30 –
  - The entire cabinet of the Spanish territory of Porto Rico resigns.
  - The House of Commons of the United Kingdom votes, 243 to 138, to reject an amendment to the Irish land laws that would have been favorable to tenants and evicted tenants.

=== April ===
- April 1 –
  - At least 40,000 coal miners in South Wales walk out on strike.
  - The Spanish cruisers Vizcaya and Ogacudo depart from Havana in preparation for war.
- April 2 –
  - Spain's flotilla of torpedo-boats reaches the Cape Verde Islands.
  - American salvage operations on the wreckage of USS Maine in Havana Harbor are discontinued.
- April 3 –
  - Avalanches in the Chilkoot Pass in the U.S. Alaskan Territory kills more than 150 people.
  - A levee break on the Ohio River in the U.S. floods Shawneetown, Illinois and kills numerous people.
- April 4 –
  - Pope Leo XIII offers to mediate between Spanish and Cuban insurgents.
  - Private steamers are sent from Key West in Florida, toward Cuba, to bring Americans home from the Spanish island colony.
  - As the U.S. halts salvage operations on the wreckage of USS Maine, the American flag is removed from the sunken ship.
- April 5 –
  - Parliamentary elections are held in Denmark and the Radical Party secures a majority.
  - Annie Oakley promotes the service of women in combat situations, with the United States military. On this day, she writes a letter to President William McKinley "offering the government the services of a company of 50 'lady sharpshooters' who would provide their own arms and ammunition should war break out with Spain."*U.S. consul-general Lee, the highest ranking diplomatic officer in Cuba, is ordered by the U.S. State Department to return.
- April 7 –
  - Spain's Foreign Minister Gullon replies to a joint appeal for peace from the Six Powers of Europe, and declares that the Spanish government has "reached the limit of international policy in conceding the demands and allowing the pretensions of the United States.
  - U.S. President McKinley replies to another note from the Six Powers stating that peace with Spain will be preserved only if Spain's war against Cuba ceases.
- April 9 –
  - The Spanish cabinet votes to suspend hostilities in Cuba.
  - Consul-General Lee of the U.S. and other American consuls in Spanish Cuba depart for the United States.
  - The U.S. Navy cruiser Topkeka and the torpedo-boat Somers depart from England to return to the United States.
- April 11 –
  - Elections are held for the Senate of Spain with an increase of the government party's majority.
  - In a message to Congress, President McKinley asks authority "to intervene in Cuba by force to re-establish peace and order in the island," short of a formal declaration of war against Spain.
- April 12 – In testimony for the U.S. Senate Committee on Foreign Relations, former Consul to Cuba Lee says that Spanish officials in Havana were aware of a plot to destroy the Maine.
- April 13 –
  - The U.S. House of Representatives votes, 322 to 19, to endorse a recommendation for President McKinley to intervene in Cuba.
  - Spain's cabinet approves extraordinary war credits.
- April 14 – In anticipation of war with the U.S., the Spanish cabinet decides to move up the date fro the opening of the Cortes from April 25 to April 20.
- April 15 –
  - The U.S. Army orders that most of its troops be concentrated along the Gulf of Mexico at New Orleans, Mobile and Tampa.
  - The U.S. Navy charters the American Line passenger steamers SS St. Louis, SS St. Paul, SS Paris and SS New York.
- April 16 – The U.S. Senate votes, 67 to 21, in favor of U.S. intervention in Cuba; 51 to 37, in favor of a resolution in favor of the independence of the rebel Republic of Cuba; and 88 to 0 for a disclaimer of any intention to exercise sovereignty over the island except for pacification.
- April 18 –
  - The House of Representatives agrees to most of the Senate's Cuban resolutions, but declines to endorse the rebel Republic of Cuba, which the Senate agrees to before the bill goes to President McKinley.
  - Commodore Howell is placed in command of the North Atlantic patrol during the war, with four ships USS Yosemite, USS Prairie, USS Yankee and USS Dixie.
- April 20 –
  - U.S. President McKinley sends an ultimatum to Spain demanding the withdrawal of all Spanish Army and Navy troops from the island and requires an answer before noon Washington time on April 23, on threat of war.
  - Spain's Cortes meets in an emergency session in Madrid to respond to the possibility of war as the Queen Regent reads a speech to the parliament from the throne. Spain's minister to Washington requests and receives his passport from the Department of State
- April 21 –
  - The Spanish government severs diplomatic relations with the U.S. before U.S. Minister to Spain Woodford can deliver the U.S. Ultimatum. Woodford turns over papers to the British Embassy.
  - Spanish–American War:
  - The United States Navy begins a blockade of Cuban ports and the USS Nashville captures a Spanish merchant ship, Buenaventura.
  - President McKinley orders a U.S. blockade of the Spanish-controlled Philippine Islands, to be led by Commodore George Dewey.
  - The Spanish Government activates 80,000 reserve troops for duty and deploys 5,000 troops to the Canary Islands.
  - U.S. Navy Captain Samson is raised to the rank of rear admiral.
- April 22 – The U.S. Department of War and the Department of the Navy issue a call for 100,000 volunteers for war with Spain.
- April 23 –
  - Spanish–American War: A conference of senior Spanish Navy officers led by naval minister Segismundo Bermejo decide to send Admiral Pascual Cervera's squadron to Cuba and Puerto Rico.
- The U.S. House of Representatives votes unanimously in favor of reorganizing the United States Army.
  - The U.S. Department of War issues a call for 100,000 volunteers in preparation for war with Spain.
  - The gunboat USS Nashville captures the Spanish merchant ship Buenaventura off of the coast of Florida.
- April 24 – The Kingdom of Spain issues a decree that it is in a state of war with the United States.
- April 25 –
  - Spanish–American War: The United States declares war on Spain; the U.S. Congress announces that a state of war has existed since April 21 (later backdating this one more day to April 20).
  - U.S. Secretary of State John Sherman resigns. President McKinley nominates William R. Day as Sherman's replacement the next day.
  - In Essen, German company Rheinisch-Westfälisches Elektrizitätswerk RWE is founded.
- April 26 –
  - An explosion in Santa Cruz, California, kills 13 workers, at the California Powder Works.
  - In Austria, the Reichsrat votes to impeach Count Kasimir Felix Badeni, the Minister-President of Cisleithania, the northern and western parts of the Empire of Austria (including Vienna) within Austria-Hungary.
  - The United Kingdom proclaims its neutrality in the Spanish-American War. Similar declarations are made by Argentina, Colombia, France, Italy, Japan, Korea, Mexico, the Netherlands, Norway, Russia, Sweden, Switzerland and Uruguay.
  - The U.S. Postmaster-General orders that no more mail be sent from the United States to addresses in Spain.
- April 27
  - In the first U.S. action in the Spanish-American War, the U.S. Navy ships New York, Puritan and Cincinnati bomb the earthworks and guns defending Matanzas in Cuba.
  - The first "bread riots" in Italy break out a Bari in southern Italy on the Adriatic coast.
- April 29 –
  - The Paris Auto Show, the first large-scale commercial vehicle exhibition show, is held in Tuileries Garden.
  - A treaty is signed between Nicaragua and Costa Rica to call a cease-fire in fighting between the two Central American nations.
  - Portugal announces its neutrality in the war between Spain and the United States.
  - The Spanish Navy cruisers Maria Teresa, Almirante Oquendo, Vizcaya and Cristobal Colon depart from the Spanish base in the Cape Verde Islands, along with the destroyers Pluton, Terror and Furor.

=== May ===
- May 1 – Spanish–American War: In the Battle of Manila Bay, the U.S. Navy fleet, led by Commodore Dewey destroys the Spanish squadron, in the first battle of the war, as well as the first battle in the Philippines Campaign. Among the 12 ships sunk are the cruisers Castilla, Don Antonio de Ulloa, Don Juan de Austria, Rear Admiral Patricio Montojo's Isla de Luzón, Reina Cristina and Velasco, and the gunboat Marques del Duero. While the Americans sustain no losses except for six men wounded, more than 600 Spanish troops are killed or wounded.
- May 2 –
  - U.S. Commodore Dewey oversees the severing of the telegraphic cable between Manila and Hong Kong, the destruction of the fortifications of Manila Bay, and the taking of the Spanish Naval station at Cavite.
  - Bread riots in Italy extend to Naples, Ravenna, and Ferrara, while at the village of Bognia Cavallo, three rioters are killed by government troops.
  - Thousands of Chinese scholars and Beijing citizens seeking reforms protest in front of the capital control yuan.
- May 3 –
  - The Italian government calls reserve troops to duty to suppress the bread riots in Milan and elsewhere.
  - As Spain's Cortes reopens, Prime Minister Praxedes Sagasta and his ministers are called on to explain why the Spanish fleet was defeated at the Battle of Manila Bay.
  - The Brazilian Congress opens at Rio de Janeiro.
- May 4 – The German Reichstag votes, 177 to 83, to revise court-martial procedures.
- May 5 – Rioting begins in Spain over the high prices of food.
- May 6 –
  - The French steamer Lafayette is captured while attempting to run throu
  - The Reichstag closes its session.
- May 7–
  - The Bava Beccaris massacre begins in Italy in Milan, and over the next two days, hundreds of demonstrators are killed after General Fiorenzo Bava Beccaris orders troops to fire on a rally.
  - China pays the remainder of its war indemnity to Japan.
  - Commodore Dewey is promoted to a rear admiral of the U.S. Navy.
- May 8 –
  - The first games of the Italian Football Federation are played, with Genoa meeting Torino.
  - Elections are held for the French Chamber of Deputies.
- May 9 – Greece executes the men who made the February 26 attempt to assassinate King George. I.
- May 10 –
  - A state of siege is proclaimed in Florence in Italy as the riots spread.
  - The U.S. Senate passes a resolution in delaying the presidential inauguration day from March 4 to May 4.
- May 11 –
  - Ensign Worth Bagley and four sailors on USS Winslow become the first Americans fatalities in the war when they are struck by an exploding shell fired by Spanish Navy gunboats at the U.S. Navy vessels Winslow, Wilmington and Hudson during an American blockade of the harbor at Cardenas in Cuba.
  - An American sailor becomes the fifth American death in the war while he and other sailors are cutting the telegraphic cable at Cienfuegos in Cuba.
  - The U.S. House of Representatives passes a bill to amend the U.S. Constitution for direct elections for Senators, at that time performed by the individual state legislatures.
- May 12 –
  - In the Spanish–American War, the Puerto Rican Campaign begins with the Bombardment of San Juan by the U.S. Navy, while members of the U.S. Army First Infantry engage in the first land skirmish with Spain in the war as they land at Port Canbanas in Cuba.
  - The Swiss government announces that groups of Italians will not be allowed to cross the border into Switzerland.
- May 13 – The resignation of the Earl of Aberdeen, Governor-General of Canada, is accepted by Queen Victoria.
- May 14 – Spanish Premier Praxedes Sagasta and his entire cabinet resign in the wake of rioting in the Kingdom.
- May 16 – The Queen Regent of Spain asks incumbent premier Praxedes Sagasta to form a new ministry, which he does on May 18.
- May 17 – The U.S. House of Representatives passes a bill to implement an eight-hour day for federal government employees.
- May 19 –
  - General Hernandez is captured in battle, ending the Venezuelan insurrection.
  - The Spanish Navy fleet, under the command of Admiral Cervera, arrives at Santiago de Cuba.
- May 22 –
  - The second round of the election in France for the 585 seats of the Chambre des députés is held for 161 offices where no candidate had received a majority of the vote on May 8. The Progressive Republicans party of Prime Minister Jules Méline retains its plurality, maintaining 254 seats, but Méline's government collapses on June 28.
  - The sinking of the schooner Jane Gray kills 35 people, most of Americans seeking gold and are traveling to the Yukon Territory of Canada.
  - Former U.S. President Benjamin Harrison is selected by the Venezuelan government to appear for the South American nation in its boundary arbitration with the UK over the border with British Guiana.
  - The German Federation football club SV Darmstadt 98 is formed.
- May 23 – The second trial of Émile Zola begins in France and adjurns on the same day.
- May 24 – In China, British troops take possession of Wei-Hai-Wei (now Weihai in the Shandong province after an agreement to lease 288 square miles (750 km^{2}) of territory .
- May 25 – The American diplomatic mission at Tongzhou in Beijing in China is looted and burned by a mob.
- May 26 –
- May 27 – The territory of Guangzhouwan is leased by China to France, according to the Treaty of 12 April 1892, as the Territoire de Kouang-Tchéou-Wan, forming part of French Indochina.
- May 28 –
  - Secondo Pia takes the first photographs of the Shroud of Turin and discovers that the image on the Shroud itself appears to be a photographic negative.
  - The government of Prime Minister Antonio Starabba di Rudinì of Italy resigns after a vote of no confidence.
- May 29 –
- May 30 –
- May 31 –
  - The American battleships USS Massachusetts and USS Iowa, and the cruiser USS New Orleans, battle the Spanish armored cruiser and flagship Cristobal Colon off of the coast of Santiago de Cuba, and fire shells taking out three of the four Spanish gun batteries.
  - Prime Minister Rudini of the Kingdom of Italy forms a new cabinet, three days after his prior government collapsed.
  - Philippine independence fighters defeat Spanish troops in a battle on the Zapote River.

=== June ===
The original flag of the Philippines as conceived by General Emilio Aguinaldo. The blue is of a lighter shade than the later mandated royal blue; the sun has eight points as in modern times but many more rays and it has a mythical face

- June 1 – The Trans-Mississippi Exposition World's Fair opens, in Omaha, Nebraska.
- June 2 – The city of Peshawar in British India (now located in Pakistan) experiences a fire that destroys most of the structures there.
- June 3 –
  - Rebels in Turkestan attack a Russian military post in the area kill 20 soldiers.
  - On orders of Admiral William T. Sampson, U.S. Navy Lieutenant Richmond P. Hobson and seven volunteers sail the collier Merrimac into the harbor of Santiago de Cuba, blow up the ship and sink it to block the channel, and are taken as prisoners of war.
- June 4 – The first U.S. military expedition to the Philippines as ships depart from Honolulu in the U.S. territory of Hawaii.
- June 5 – Representatives of Japan and Russia sign a protocol to guarantee the continued independence of the Empire of Korea.
- June 6 – The U.S. Navy bombards the outer fortifications of Santiago de Cuba without any damages to the American vessels.
- June 7 – William Ramsay and Morris Travers discover neon at their laboratory at University College London, after extracting it from liquid nitrogen.
- June 9 – The British government arranges a 99-year lease of extended territories of Hong Kong from China.
- June 10 – Tuone Udaina, the last known speaker of the Dalmatian language, is killed in an explosion.
- June 11 –
  - The Guangxu Emperor of China announces the creation of what will later become Peking University.
  - The Japanese Diet is dissolved and new elections are scheduled for August 10.
  - Two U.S. Marines officers and two privates, commanded by Lieutenant Colonel R. W. Huntington, are killed in an attack by Spanish troops at Guantanamo Bay.
  - The Lick Observatory at the University of California in the U.S. reports the discovery by astronomer Edwin Foster Coddington of a comet (now C/1898 L1 (Coddington–Pauly) in the area of the constellation of Scorpio.
- June 12 –
  - Philippine Declaration of Independence: After 333 years of Spanish dominance, General Emilio Aguinaldo declares the Philippines' independence from Spain.
  - Lieutenant General and former president Julio Argentino Roca is elected to a six year term as the 14th President of Argentina, to begin on October 12.
  - The Queipa Revolution in Venezuela ends when its leader, General José Manuel Hernández, is captured in a surprise attack.
- June 13 –
  - The Yukon Territory is formed in Canada, with Dawson chosen as its capital.
  - France and England sign a convention to resolve the boundary dispute between their African colonies at Niger and Nigeria, respectively.
- June 14 –
  - In the Chamber of Deputies, the French government of Prime Minister Jules Méline loses a vote of confidence. Méline resigns on June 28.
  - In a battle at Guantanamo Bay, the Spanish Army suffers 200 killed and wounded.
- June 15 – Prime Minister Méline of France and his cabinet resign, and Meline attempts to form a new cabinet.
- June 17 – President Félix Faure of France asks former premier Alexandre Ribot to form a new ministry, but Ribot announces the next day that he cannot form a new coalition.
- June 18 – Prime Minister Rudini of Italy and his cabinet resign after the failure of the government formed three weeks earlier.
- June 19 – Food processing giant Nabisco is founded in Chicago by merger as the National Biscuit Company.
- June 21 –
  - In the Spanish–American War, the United States captures Guam, making it the first overseas territory of the U.S.
  - Delegates from El Salvador, Honduras and Nicaragua meet a Managua to form a constitution for the proposed Central American Federation.
  - At the launching of the British Royal Navy battleship Albion at Blackwall, 37 spectators are drowned when the platform they are standing on is wrecked.
  - The U.S. cruiser USS Charleston forces the Spanish Army to surrender the Ladrones Islands in the Philippines.
- June 22 –
  - Direct cable communication is established between Washington, D.C. and Guantanamo Bay in Cuba.
  - The Spanish cruiser Terror attacks the U.S. Navy cruiser St. Paul off of San Juan in Puerto Rico, and the Terror is disabled.
- June 23 –
  - A Chinese warship at Port Arthur is wrecked by a typhoon and 130 of its crew are drowned.
  - Count Cassini presents his credentials to U.S. President McKinley as the first Russian Ambassador to the United States.
  - American troops complete their landing at Santiago de Cuba.
- June 24 –
  - In a battle between the U.S. Army "Rough Riders" (commanded by Colonel Leonard Wood and Lt. Col. Theodore Roosevelt) against a larger force of Spanish Army soldiers at Sevilla in Puerto Rico, 16 Americans are killed and 41 more wounded before the Spanish troops retreat.
  - An expedition to the Arctic, commanded by the Norwegian explorer Captain Sverdrup, departs from Christiania (now Oslo) on the ship Fram.
- June 25 –
  - M. Peytral of France announces that he is unable to form a coalition cabinet of ministers, and the task is assigned to Henri Brisson.
  - American troops led by General Chaffee occupy Sevilla.
- June 26 –
  - Marquis Ito resigns as Prime Minister of Japan.
  - A British Arctic Expedition, commanded by Walter Wllman, departs from Tromsoe in Norway.
- June 27 – The second round of voting is held for members of the Reichstag in Germany in districts where no candidate had attained a majority in the June 13 first round.
- June 28 –
  - The Curtis Act of 1898 takes effect and will lead to the dissolution of tribal and communal lands in Indian Territory and ultimately the creation of the State of Oklahoma in 1907.
  - Okuma Stagaki forms a new government as Japanese Prime Minister.
  - Henri Brisson becomes Prime Minister of France when he completes organization of a cabinet of ministers.
- June 29 – General Pelloux forms a new cabinet as Prime Minister of Italy.
- June 30 – The French Chamber of Deputies votes its confidence in the new Brisson government.

=== July ===
- July 1 –
  - Spanish–American War: Battle of San Juan Hill – United States troops (including Buffalo Soldiers and Theodore Roosevelt's Rough Riders) take a strategic position close to Santiago de Cuba from the Spanish.
  - The Wei-Hai-Wei treaty is signed between China and the United Kingdom for a British lease of Chinese territory.
- July 2 –
  - Spanish troops attempt to retake San Juan and fight in battle for two days against the U.S. troops under General Lawton. During the battle, the U.S. Army loses 230 troops, including 22 officers, while another 1,284 are wounded and 79 are missing in action.
  - Newspaper publication comes to a halt in all Chicago daily papers as the stereotypers' union goes on strike. The strike lasts through the end of July 5.
- July 3
  - Spanish–American War: Battle of Santiago de Cuba – The United States Navy destroys the Spanish Navy's Caribbean Squadron, and four U.S. Navy battleships (Brooklyn, Oregon, Iowa and Texas) stop the Spanish Navy ships Infanta Maria Teresa, Almirante Ogucudo and Vizcaya from fleeing the harbor, while Cristobal Colon, Furor and Pluton are wrecked. Admiral Cevera and more than 700 Spanish officers and men are taken as prisoners of war.
  - American adventurer Joshua Slocum completes a 3-year solo circumnavigation of the world.
- July 4 –
  - The ocean liner SS La Bourgogne sinks with the loss of 549 passengers and crew in the worst maritime disaster up to that time. Le Bourgogne was traveling from New York to Le Havre when it collided with another ship.
  - An attempted revolution in Uruguay is suppressed in fighting in Montevideo, as 60 people are killed and 300 wounded.
- July 5 – the British House of Commons rejects John Redmond's resolution to respond to Ireland's tax complaints, with 286 against and only 144 in favor.
- July 6 –
  - By a vote of 42 to 21, the U.S. Senate approves a bill to annex the Republic of Hawaii and the legislation is sent to the House of Representatives.
  - A prisoner exchange takes place at Santiago as Lieutenant Hobson and his seven volunteers are exchanged for Spanish prisoners.
- July 7 – The United States annexes the Hawaiian Islands as President McKinley signs the resolution. The President dispatches the U.S. Navy cruiser Philadelphia to Honolulu to raise the American flag over the islands.
- July 10 – Spanish Navy Admiral Cervera and other officers taken as prisoners of war at Santiago arrive for incarceration at Portsmouth, New Hampshire. The prisoners are then transported to Annapolis, Maryland for imprisonment on the grounds of the U.S. Naval Academy.
- July 11 –
- July 12 –
  - The new Imperial Japanese Navy cruiser Kasagi travels at the unprecedented average speed of 22.75 knots, almost 26 miles per hour (42 km/h).
  - The Peruvian Congress approves the protocol of peace with Chile.
- July 13 – In London, the newly-formed Anglo-American League opens its inaugural meeting.
- July 14 – Spanish Army General Toral agrees to the unconditional surrender of Santiago de Cuba to U.S. General Shafter.
- July 17 – Spanish–American War: In the Battle of Santiago Bay, troops under United States General William R. Shafter take the city of Santiago de Cuba from the Spanish.
- July 18 –
  - "The Adventures of Louis de Rougemont" first appear in The Wide World Magazine, as its August 1898 issue goes on sale.
  - Emile Zola and Perreux are found guilty of libel and each sentenced to a year imprisonment and a fine of 3,000 French francs.
- July 21 –
  - General Miles departs from Guantanamo Bay in Cuba with nine warships and 3,400 men to invade Puerto Rico.
  - The port of Nipe Cuban province of Santiago is bombarded by American ships and the Spanish cruiser Jorge Juan is destroyed.
- July 22 – Insurgent leader Emilio Aguinaldo declares himself to the ruler of the Philippine Islands.
- July 23 – Italy and Argentina sign a general arbitration treaty.
- July 25 –
  - Spanish–American War: The United States invasion of Puerto Rico begins, with a landing at Guánica Bay.
  - Queen Victoria of the United Kingdom approves the appointment of the Earl of Minto to succeed the Earl of Aberdeen as the Governor-General of Canada.
  - The town of Pugwash, Nova Scotia, is destroyed by fire.
- July 26 – Spain opens negotiations for peace with the United States, with the French Ambassador to the U.S., Jules Cambon, as its representative.
- July 27 – U.S. Navy Rear Admiral, on the USS Philadelphia, raises the American flag over the recently annexed Hawaiian Islands.
- July 28 –
  - President Pierola opens the Peruvian Congress.
  - The government of Haiti refuses to allow the U.S. to establish a weather station on its territory.
- July 29 The Irish local government bill passes its third reading in the House of Lords and is sent to the Queen for royal assent.–
- July 30 – Pope Leo XIII issues a papal encyclical urging the people of Scotland to return from the Church of Scotland to the Roman Catholic Church.
- July 31 – Spanish troops in the Philippines attack a U.S. Army force at Malate, killing nine U.S. soldiers and seriously wounding nine others, while Spanish losses are heavy.

=== August ===
August 28: Caleb Bradham names his soft drink Pepsi-Cola

- August 1 – American inventor William Abner Eddy files for a patent for the what is now called the "Malay kite", a diamond shaped, two-stick kite that became the standard for kite flying for decades, and began marketing it as the "Eddy Kite". He would be granted U.S. Patent No. 646,375 on March 27, 1900.
- August 2 – The Empress Dowager of China announces that she has relieved the Emperor of all power, and appointed Hung Chang as her chief adviser.
- August 3 – The United States Spirits Association is founded in Cincinnati
- August 4 – SMS Iltis, the first of the German Navy's revolutionary Iltis series of gunboats, is launched from Danzig (now Gdansk in Poland).
- August 5 – Metody Patchev, the Bulgarian leader of the terrorist Internal Macedonian Revolutionary Organization (IMRO) murders Dimitatr Grdanov, a pro-Serbian activist viewed as a threat to the Macedonian independence movement, and is jailed by the Ottoman government.
- August 6 – The governments of the Philippine cities of Muntinlupa, Navotas and Taguig join the rebel government of Emilio Aguinaldo.
- August 7 – Turkey informs the U.S. that it will not be responsible for damages sustained by Americans in the Armenian massacre.
- August 8 – Two days after the funeral for the late Otto Von Bismarck, most of the business district of Bismarck, North Dakota, is destroyed.
- August 9 – Spanish–American War: Hostilities end between American and Spanish forces in Cuba.
- August 10 –
  - George N. Curzon is appointed by the Queen as the new Viceroy of India.
  - A West Indian U.S. weather monitoring site begins operation in the west Indies.
- August 11 –
  - A team of American mountaineers led by William O. Owen become the first people to reach the top of the 13,775 feet (4,199 m) tall Grand Teton mountain in Wyoming.
  - A train crash on the Turin-Genoa railway in Italy kills 13 people and injures 20 others after the crew of a freight train is overcome by smoke in the Giovi Tunnel and the freight locomotive slams into a passenger stopped at Piano Orizzontale dei Giovi between Pontedecimo and Busalla.
- August 12 –
  - The United States formally annexes the Territory of Hawaii in a formal ceremony of the lowering of the Republic of Hawaii flag from in front of the Iolani Palace and the raising of the American flag.
  - A preliminary peace agreement is signed between the United States and Spain at the Treaty Room of the White House in Washington, D.C., ending U.S.-Spain hostilities in Cuba, Puerto Rico and the Philippines.
  - In the United Kingdom of Great Britain and Ireland, Queen Victoria gives royal assent to the Local Government (Ireland) Act 1898, to take effect March 25, 1899 and setting the boundaries for counties and county boroughs, and establishing a uniform method of local government throughout the island.
- August 13 –
  - Spanish–American War: Battle of Manila – By prior agreement, the Spanish commander surrenders the city of Manila in the Philippines to the United States, in order to keep it out of the hands of Filipino rebels, ending the war.
  - Flash flooding from a heavy downpour drowns 26 people in Hawkins County, Tennessee.
- August 14 – The Colombian government agrees to Italy's demands in resolving the Cerruti claim after a squadron of Italian warships approaches the coast.
- August 15 – Portugal's Prime Minister Jose Luciano de Castro resigns along with his cabinet of ministers.
- August 16 – At the Royal Surgical Hospital at Kiel University, German neurosurgeon August Bier carries out the first surgical operation using spinal anesthesia, injecting 15 milligrams of a 0.5% cocaine solution into the spinal canal of an unidentified worker who had sustained a severe fracture of the left ankle, complicated by infection. The patient remains fully conscious during the surgery but reports that he is not in pain.
- August 17 –
  - In the war by Britain and Egypt against Sudan, the Mahdist Sudani ship Ismailah carries out an operation to place naval mines on the White Nile river, near Omdurman. One the Sudani mines explodes while it is being placed, destroying the Ismailah.
  - in the Arizona Territory of the United States, the U.S. General Land Office sets aside 1,524 square miles (3,950 km^{2}) of mointain land to create the San Francisco Mountains Forest Reserve, now part of the Coconino National Forest
- August 18 –
  - The radioactive element polonium is discovered by Marie Sklodowska-Curie and Pierre Curie.
  - In the British Solomon Islands, Britain's High Commissioner for the Western Pacific issues a proclamation that the Reef Islands of Anuda and Fataka shall be under British protection, as well as the Trevannion Islands and the Duff Group.
  - The 10,735 feet (3,272 m) high Mount Balfour in Canada, on the border of Alberta and British Columbia is climbed for the first time, with three members of the Appalachian Mountain Club (C. L. Noyes, C.S. Thompson, and G.M. Weed) making the successful attempt.
- August 19 –
  - In the Philippines, as the Spanish war against the Philippine insurgents and the U.S. Army and Navy draws to a close, the last Spanish troops surrender Spain's last Philippine territory, the District of Morong, to the Katipunan Filipino revolutionaries.
  - The siege of Masbate is fought in the Philippines between the Spanish colonial Army and the Pulahan insurgents on Mabate Island The Spanish governor of Mabate, Don Luis Cubero, leaves along with his 1,000 troops while Pulahan rebel leaders Pedro Quipte and Riego de Dios destroy the Masbate and declare the island to be liberated.
- August 20 –
  - Mail service resumes between the U.S. and Spain.
  - The Gornergrat railway opens, connecting Zermatt to the Gornergrat in Switzerland.
- August 21 –
  - Admrial Vallarino and Generals Ortega and Sanchez Delaguila of Spain are named as the commissioners for the evacuation of Puerto Rico.
  - Clube de Regatas Vasco da Gama is founded in Rio de Janeiro.
- August 22 – King Malietoa Laupepa dies, prompting the outbreak of the Second Samoan Civil War as Laupepa's son Malietoa Tanumafili I and a rival claimant, Mataʻafa Iosefo.
- August 23 –
  - The Southern Cross Expedition, the first British venture of the Heroic Age of Antarctic Exploration, sets sail from London.
  - The German Arctic expedition, led by Theodor Lerner, returns to Hammerfest in Norway after an unsuccessful search for a lost colleague.
- August 24 –
  - Representatives of the Chickasaw and Choctaw tribes in the U.S. sign the Atoka Agreement, a requirement of the Curtis Act of 1898.
  - At Vienna, the Austrian and Hungarian premiers in Austria-Hungary begin a conference on the subject of the Ausleich, setting the relationship of the powers in the Dual Monarchy.
- August 25 –
  - At least 700 Greeks and 15 Englishmen are slaughtered by the Turks in Heraklion, Greece, leading to the establishment of the autonomous Cretan State.
  - The Sudanese Mahdi ships Safia and Tawfiqiyeh tow barges bringing more than 2,000 Sudanese soldiers up the Blue Nile to attack the French-held town of Fashoda.
- August 26 – The Principality of Liechtenstein by decree of its ruler, Prince Johann II, replacing the Austro-Hungarian krone with its own minted coin and currency, the Liechtenstein krone (or crown) of equal value, and worth 100 Liechtenstein heller. The krone coins are taken out of circulation 22 years later, on August 28, 1920, and Liechtenstein reforms in its currency again on May 26, 1924, introducing the Liechtenstein franc.
- August 27 – By order of the Tsar of Russia, the Russian Foreign Minister proposes an international conference among the major world powers to discuss disarmament.
- August 28 –
  - In North Carolina, American pharmacist Caleb Bradham names his soft drink Pepsi-Cola, in part because of his promotion of the cola as a good-tasting medicinal relief for dyspepsia.
  - The worldwide Zionist congress convenes at Basel in Switzerland to discuss creation of a Jewish nation, preferably in the area where the kingdoms of Israel and Judaea ahd existed.
- August 29 – The British Trade Union Congress meets at Bristol.
- August 30 – Walter Wellman's arctic expedition returns to Tromso in Norway.
- August 31 –
  - The freighter Allegheny arrives at Montauk Point with U.S. Army troops returning from Santiago de Cuba, and officials discover that 14 of the passengers died during the trip in what is described as more of a train "cattle car" than a hospital ship.
  - The South Wales coal strike in Britain is ended with an agreement between miners and employers at Cardiff.
  - The U.S. Navy releases all Spanish prisoners of war who had been incarcerated at Annapolis or at Seavey's Island.
  - French Army Colonel Henry commits suicide in prison after admitting that he had forget a letter that had led to the wrongful conviction of Captain Dreyfuss for treason.
  - The Congress of Ecuador suspends further sessions and the cabinet resigns

=== September ===
- September 1 – Sir Henry McCallum is appointed Governor of Newfoundland, at the time a separate nation from the Dominion of Canada.
- September 2 –
  - Battle of Omdurman (Mahdist War): British and Egyptian troops led by Major General Kitchener defeat Sudanese tribesmen led by Khalifa Abdullah al-Taashi, thus establishing British dominance in the Sudan. 11,000 Sudanese are killed and 1,600 wounded in the battle, with fewer than 50 on the British side killed.
  - Philippine insurgents invade the southern Philippine Islands.
- September 3 – France's Minister of War Cavaignac resigns in protest of the revision of the Dreyfus conviction and is succeeded by General Zurlinden.
- September 4 – British and Egyptian troops enter Khartoum after the triumph at Omduran and raise their flags over the royal palace in proclamation of Anglo-Egyptian Sudan.
- September 5 – Queen Wilhelmina becomes the new Queen of the Netherlands.
- September 6 – Rioting of Muslims in Candia, on the island of Crete, is responded to by a bombardment of the town by British gunboats.
- September 7 – Li Hung Chang is dismissed from his position as the premier of the Chinese Empire because of his partiality to Russia over other nations in being awarded concessions to build a railroad.
- September 8 – Manuel Estrada Cabrera is elected as President of Guatemala.
- September 10 – Italian anarchist Luigi Lucheni assassinates Empress Elisabeth of Austria in Geneva, as an act of propaganda of the deed.
- September 11 – A hurricane in the British West Indies kills more than 500 people, as well as destroying thousands of buildings and leaving more than 50,000 people homeless.
- September 12 – A typhoon in central Japan kills around 100 people.
- September 13 –
  - Spain's Chamber of Deputies votes in favor of the terms of the Spanish-American peace protocol.
  - Lorenzo Snow becomes the new president of the Church of Jesus Christ of Latter-day Saints, succeeding the late Wilford Woodruff.
- September 14 – The Turkish government rejects a demand from the United Kingdom to withdraw its troops from Candia on the island of Crete.
- September 15 – Muslim riot leaders in Crete are arrested and delivered to the Admiral of Britain's Royal Navy.
- September 17 –
  - The funeral of the Empress of Austria is held in Vienna.
  - France's new Minister of War, General Zurlinden, resigns office along with Tillaye, Minister of Public Works.
- September 18 –
  - Fashoda Incident: A powerful flotilla of British gunboats arrives at the French-occupied fort of Fashoda on the White Nile, leading to a diplomatic stalemate, until French troops are ordered to withdraw on November 3.
  - A new record for highest altitude attained by a human is set above London's Crystal Palace as the aircraft reaches 27,500 feet (8,400 m) above the Earth.
- September 20 – Spain begins its evacuation of Spanish troops from Puerto Rico.
- September 21
  - Empress Dowager Cixi of China engineers a coup d'état, marking the end of the Hundred Days' Reform; the Guangxu Emperor is arrested.
  - Geert Adriaans Boomgaard of Groningen in the Netherlands becomes the world's first validated supercentenarian.
  - Admiral Cervera of the Spanish Navy, taken as a prisoner of war by the United States, is returned to Spain after his release.
- September 22 –
  - The nations of Colombia and Italy sever all diplomatic relations after Italian warships had arrived off of the Colombian coast.
  - Chile issues an ultimatum to Argentina on settling the dispute over their common boundary at Altagama. On October 2, Argentina rejects all four demands made by Chile
- September 23 –
  - The new German Navy harbor at Stettin (now Szeczin in Poland) is opened in a ceremony by Kaiser Wilhelm II and his wife, the Empress.
  - A coal mine explosion at Brownsville, Pennsylvania kills eight miners and traps others underground.
- September 24 –
- September 25 –
- September 26 – The International Peace Congress opens in Italy at Turin.
- September 27 –
  - The new Dowager Empress Cixi of China rescinds the reforms made by the recently deposed Emperor Guangxu.
  - A storm in Buffalo, New York, kills six people and injures many others.
- September 28 –
- September 29 – The prohibition on the sale and distribution of liquor in Canada passes by a small majority in a referendum.
- September 30 – The Chancellor of Austria in the Austro-Hungarian Empire loses a vote of confidence by 10 votes, but the opposition decides against asking his resignation.

=== October ===
- October 1 – The Vienna University of Economics and Business is founded, under the name K.u.K. Exportakademie.
- October 2 –
  - A fire at the Chinese port of Hankou on the Yangtze River kills hundreds of people destroys more than one square mile of the city.
  - A severe hurricane strikes the U.S. states of Georgia and South Carolina.
- October 3 – U.S. Senator Matthew Quay of Pennsylvania is arrested for conspiracy to defraud the People's Bank of Philadelphia.
- October 4 – The American steam boat Walkatomica, which has made regular runs for travelers along the Gulf Coast of Florida since 1885, is destroyed by fire while in port in Tallahassee.
- October 5 – At the Battle of Sugar Point in the Indian Wars, some Pillager Band of Chippewa Indians (a group of Ojibwe, referred to at the time as Chippewa) warriors, led by Bugonaygeshig, defeat U.S. Army infantry troops in northern Minnesota, with seven U.S. troops killed and 19 wounded. Bugonayegeshig, whom the American soldiers were sent to capture, escapes and is never apprehended.
- October 6 – The Sinfonia Club, later to become the Phi Mu Alpha Sinfonia fraternity, is founded at the New England Conservatory of Music in Boston by Ossian Everett Mills.
- October 7 –
  - U.S. President McKinley announces that all remaining Spanish military personnel must leave Puerto Rico by October 18, and all in Cuba must leave by December 1. In response, Spanish Army General Blanco permits Spanish soldiers to remain in Cuba.
  - In the downsizing of the U.S. Army by 50 percent after the end of the Spanish-American War, 29 generals are honorably discharged.
  - Civil courts in the U.S. Territory of the Philippines, closed since the United States had captured the territory from Spain and started its occupation on August 13, are reopened under the supervision of the U.S. Military Governor.
  - During the Paris exposition on France, 60,000 workers, including those employed at the exposition, walk out on strike.
- October 8 – Britain and France release their official correspondence on their negotiations respecting the Upper Nile river.
- October 9 – Ignatius Ephrem II Rahmani is elected as the new Patriarch of Antioch, leader of the Syriac Catholic Church, subject to the approval of Pope Leo XIII, which is made on November 28.
- October 10 – A military expedition departs from France toward the French Equatorial Africa colony of Chad. Commanded by Lieutenant de vaisseau Henri Bretonnet and Lt. Solomon Braun, the force is sent to liberate areas dominated by the Muslim warlord Rabih az-Zubayr, with the help of troops sent by the envoys of the Muslim rulers Mohammed al-Senoussi and Gaourang II, sultan of Bagirmi
- October 11 –
  - The Kubok Obschestva Velosipednoy Ezdy (Bicycle Riders Society Cup) first Grand Prix in Russia is staged with seven cars near Saint Petersburg, on a route from Alexandrovskaya to Strelna and back again for a total distance of 25 miles (40 km), and is won by Pavel Belyaev.
  - Turkey consents to the evacuation of its forces from the Greek island of Crete but asks for a modification of the conditions demanded by the Six Powers.
- October 12 –
  - The "Battle of Virden" takes place in the coal mining town of Virden, Illinois, when strikebreakers of the Thiel Detective Service Company exchange gunfire with armed members of the United Mine Workers of America. Thirteen people are killed and 35 wounded in the fight. In all, eight UMWA miners and five strikebreakers die from their injuries. The train, attempting to bring about 100 African-American coal miners to Virden, departs without disembarking its passengers.
  - General Roca takes the oath of office as the new President of Argentina.
  - The Michigan–Michigan State football rivalry begins in U.S. college football as Michigan University defeats Michigan Agricultural College, 39 to 0.
- October 13 –
- October 14 –
  - The sinking of the Atlantic Transport steamer Mohegan drowns 116 of the 161 people on board.
  - At the age of 16, Russian composer Igor Stravinsky creates his first composition, the unfinished piano fragment "Tarantella". The piece will remain undiscovered for 72 years and will first be performed in 2021, more than 120 years after it was composed.
  - The French government announces that it has discovered and foiled a plot by military leaders to overthrow the premier and the cabinet of ministers.
- October 15 –
  - The 1898 Major League Baseball season comes to an end with the Boston Beaneaters (now the Atlanta Braves finish in first place in the 12-team National League with a record of 102 wins and 47 losses, six games ahead of the Baltimore Orioles (a 19th century NL team unrelated to the modern American League team) in second place with a 96-53 record. In the final game of the season, Boston defeats Baltimore 10 to 8. Boston had effectively clinched the pennant on October 7 with a 7 to 2 win over the Brooklyn Bridegrooms (now the Los Angeles Dodgers), in first place by 5 1/2 games with only 5 games left in the season.
  - The Fork Union Military Academy is founded, in Fork Union, Virginia.
  - In Canada, the "9 O'Clock Gun" is fired for the first time at Stanley Park in Vancouver, and goes on to become a daily tradition to serve as a time signal for ships in port and for local residents to set their timepieces at exactly 9:00 p.m. local time.
- October 16 –
  - The island of Puerto Rico is turned over by Spain to the United States. Ángel Rivero Méndez, the 149th and last Spanish governor of Puerto Rico, yields the office and turns over the keys to all military installations in the capital, San Juan to U.S. Army Captain Henry A. Reed, and General John R. Brooke becomes the new American military governor.
  - The American ferryboat Berkeley, the only means prior to 1937 for motor vehicles to travel directly across San Francisco Bay between San Francisco and Oakland, is launched. Its role will be superseded in 1937 by the opening of the Golden Gate Bridge.
- October 17 –
- October 18 – The University of Chicago college of law confers the degree of Juris Doctor on U.S. President McKinley during his visit to the Chicago Peace Festival proceedings.
- October 19 – The Universidad Literaria y Cientifica de Filipinas, the first Filipino operated university and the precursor to the University of the Philippines, is established shortly after the proclamation of the First Philippine Republic.
- October 20 –
  - The first residents of the "cooperative socialist colony", created by the Cooperative Brotherhood, arrive at what is now Burley, Washington in Kitsap County, settling on 260 acres (1.1 km^{2}) of land purchased by the Brotherhood.
  - The cabinet of the Prime Minister of Korea resigns.
  - France demands reparations from China for the murder of Christian missionaries by Chinese rebels, and a guarantee against future attacks.
- October 21 – General Leonard Wood, the U.S. military governor of Cuba, issues a proclamation guaranteeing personal rights to the Cuban people.
- October 22 – In a race riot near Harperville, Mississippi in the U.S., 14 African-Americans and one white person are killed.
- October 23 – An anarchist, suspected of plotting the assassination of Germany's Kaiser Wilhelm II, is arrested in Egypt at Alexandria.
- October 24 –
  - The last Spanish soldiers in Puerto Rico, led by General Ortega, depart on ships to return to Spain.
  - U.S. President William McKinley extends the deadline for all Spanish troops to leave Cuba. Set to expire on December 1, the last day to depart is extended to January 1, 1899.
  - Augustus Herring, hired by civil engineer Octave Chanute to design and help test heavier-than-air flying machines, reportedly makes a flight near St. Joseph, Michigan, traveling slightly above the ground for a level distance of more than 70 feet (21 m) in 10 seconds.
  - Chinese soldiers attack a party of British engineers at the Marco Polo Bridge on the Beijing to Hankou railway.
- October 25 – The Academia Militar, precursor to the Philippine Military Academy, is founded at Malolos by decree of Philippine Republic President Emilio Aguinaldo.
- October 26 –
  - A collision between two Japanese steamers at sea kills 60 Japanese sailors.
  - The U.S. begins the release and repatriation of Spanish Navy sailors who had been taken as prisoners of war in the Philippines, and sends them back to Spain.
- October 27 – The Court of Cassation in Paris hears arguments from lawyers regarding a new trial in the Dreyfus case. The Court grants the request on October 29.
- October 28 –
  - A general uprising by Filipinos, led by Adriano Hernández against the remaining Spanish authorities in the Philippines begins in the province of Iloilo on the island of Panay.
  - U.S. President William McKinley rejects a peace proposal that would result in Spain ceding the island of Luzon to the U.S., in return for Spanish control of the other Philippine Islands. McKinley's message to his five-man negotiating team in Paris is that "Cessation of Luzon alone, leaving the rest of the islands subject to Spanish rule, or to be the subject of future contention, cannot be justified on political, commercial, or humanitarian grounds. The cessation must be the whole archipelago or none."
- October 29 –
  - France's Court of Cassation grants a rehearing on the Dreyfus case.
  - Kaiser Wilhelm II of Germany and his wife arrive at Jerusalem in Ottoman-ruled Palestine and visit the Church of the Holy Sepulchre.
- October 30 – The Imperial Russian government announces that the leaders of the world's major nations have accepted the invitation of the Tsar to take part in a proposed conference on disarmament.
- October 31 –
  - The Lutheran Church of the Redeemer, Jerusalem, is dedicated after the Sultan of the Ottoman Empire presents the area, said to be the site of the Virgin Mary's home, to Germany's Roman Catholics.
  - Count Ōkuma Shigenobu, Japan's Prime Minister, announces his resignation along with that of his cabinet of ministers.

=== November ===
- November 1 – Charles Dupuy forms a new government as Prime Minister of France following the resignation of Henri Brisson.
- November 3 – With increasing violence threatened by rebels in China, the Russian fleet at Port Arthur and the British warships at Wei-Hai-Wei are readied for battle.
- November 5 –
  - Negros Revolution: Filipinos on the island of Negros revolt against Spanish rule and establish the short-lived Republic of Negros.
  - In China, an admiral of the Imperial Russian Navy and 40 sailors are denied permission by the Chinese government to proceed from Tientsin to Beijing.
  - In the U.S., the collapse of a theater under construction in Detroit kills 11 workmen.
- November 6 – The Japanese ambassador to China meets with the Emperor and the Empress Dowager at Beijing.
- November 7 – The final meeting of the Cuban Assembly of the República de Cuba en Armas, which had been founded in 1895 during the Cuban War of Independence, is called to order by General Calixto García in the city of Santa Cruz del Sur. Domingo Méndez Capote is elected as president of the assembly.
- November 8 –
  - Elections are held in the U.S. for all 357 seats in the House of Representatives, as well as for the governors and state legislature of 25 of the 45 states. With 179 needed for a majority, the Republican Party maintains control with 187 seats, despite losing 19; the Democratic party gains 37 to reach 124 seats; the Populist party losses all but five of its 22 seats, and the other 4 seats are controlled by smaller parties. Among Governors elected are Theodore Roosevelt as Governor of the state of New York.
  - Count Yamagata Aritomo forms a new government as Prime Minister of Japan.
- November 9 – In the U.S., the racial violence in Phoenix, South Carolina, comes to an end after 12 African-Americans have been lynched.
- November 10 –
  - The Wilmington massacre of 1898 begins as a coup d'état by the white Democratic Party of the U.S. state of North Carolina against the Republican Mayor of Wilmington. On the first day, a building housing a negro newspaper is burned and eight African Americans are killed.
  - The new United Central American States, a merger of El Salvador, Honduras and Nicaragua, places its capital in the Nicaraguan city of Chinandega.
  - Bartolomé Masó, the President of the República de Cuba en Armas that had been founded during the Cuban War of Independence, resigns.
- November 11 – In Wilmington, negro leaders and white republicans are forced to leave the city by new government.
- November 12 – The Earl of Minto takes office as the new Governor General of Canada.
- November 17 – Fighting begins in Pana, Illinois, between striking white coal miners and black miners hired to replace them.
- November 18 – The wreck of the ship Atalanta off the coast of the U.S. state of Oregon kills 28 of the 30 crew aboard.
- November 19 – In U.S. college football, Harvard University defeats Yale University, 17 to 0, to close the season unbeaten.
- November 21 – At the Paris conference to end the Spanish-American War, the U.S. commissioners offer $20,000,000 for purchase of the Philippines from Spain.
- November 24 – Italy sends an ultimatum to the Sultan of Morocco concerning treatment of Italian residents.
- November 26 –
  - General Ramón Blanco resigns as the Spanish Governor-General of Cuba and is replaced by General Adolfo Jiménez Castellanos.
  - A two-day blizzard known as the Portland Gale piles snow in Boston, severely impacting the Massachusetts fishing industry and several coastal New England towns.
  - The U.S. Marines arrive on USS Boston at Tientsin in China in order to guard the American legation at Beijing.
- November 27 – All 115 people aboard the American steamer SS Portland are killed when the ship founders off of the coast of Cape Cod.
- November 28 –The Spanish peace commissioners in Paris announce that they accept the offer of the U.S. to purchase the Philippines.
- November 30 – The United Central American States, a merger of Nicaragua, Honduras and El Salvador, is formally dissolved after the government was unable to suppress a revolution in San Salvador.

=== December ===
- December 1 –
  - President Alfaro of Ecuador suspends the government and assumes a dictatorship over the South American nation.
  - The French government decrees a ban on imports of fruit and plants from the United States.
- December 2 – The French Chamber of Deputies declines to endorse the policies of Prime Minister Charles Dupuy, with the vote failing 228 to 243.
- December 3 – The Republic of Nicaragua issues a decree announcing its return to sovereignty as a separate nation after its union with El Salvador and Honduras collapses.
- December 4 –
  - President Zelaya of Nicaragua appoints a new cabinet free of ministers from El Salvador or Honduras.
  - The wreck of the British steamer SS Clan Drummond in the Bay of Biscay kills 37 people on board.
- December 5 – A fire at a factory in the Russian city of Vilana (modern-day Vilnius in Lithuania) kills 15 women and girls, most of whom die after jumping from the windows.
- December 6 – The Chancellor of Germany opens the new session of the Reichstag and asks for an increase in the budget for the German Army.
- December 9 – The first of the two Tsavo Man-Eaters is shot by John Henry Patterson; the second is killed 3 weeks later, after 135 railway construction workers have been killed by the lions.
- December 10 – The Treaty of Paris is signed, ending the Spanish–American War.
- December 12 – The French Chamber of Deputies votes 403 to 78 in favor of the Depuy government.
- December 15 –
  - A warrant issued in Paris for the arrest of Count Ferdinand Esterhazy in connection with the Dreyfus case.
  - A new President of the Swiss Confederation is elected.
  - The French Chamber of Deputies votes to extend a loan of 200,000,000 francs for the construction of railroads in French Indochina.
- December 18 – Gaston de Chasseloup-Laubat sets the first official land speed record in an automobile, averaging 63.15 km/h (39.24 mph) over 1 km (0.62 mi) in France.
- December 21 – Prince George of Greece arrives in Crete as its High Commissioner, and is escorted by the flagships of four nations.
- December 25 – Penny postage goes into effect throughout the British Empire, setting the cost of mailing a letter to most British colonies at one pence. Rates remain the same for mail to Australia, New Zealand and the Cape Colony.
- December 26 – Marie and Pierre Curie announce the discovery of an element that they name radium.
- December 27 – The French government delivers its secret dossier on the Dreyfus case to the Court of Cassation.
- December 28 – The Swiss village of Airolo is buried in an avalanche.
- December 29 –
  - The Moscow Art Theatre production of The Seagull by Anton Chekhov opens.
  - King Umberto of Italy commutes the sentences of all prisoners who had been given the death penalty.
- December 31 –
  - Chief Justice Chambers of the Samoan Supreme Court rules that Malietoa Tanus is entitled to become King of Samoa, and holds that Mataafa is barred by the Treaty of Berlin.
  - French serial killer Joseph Vacher is executed at Bourg-en-Bresse.

=== Unknown dates ===
- The first volume of the Linguistic Survey of India is published in Calcutta.

== Births ==
=== January ===
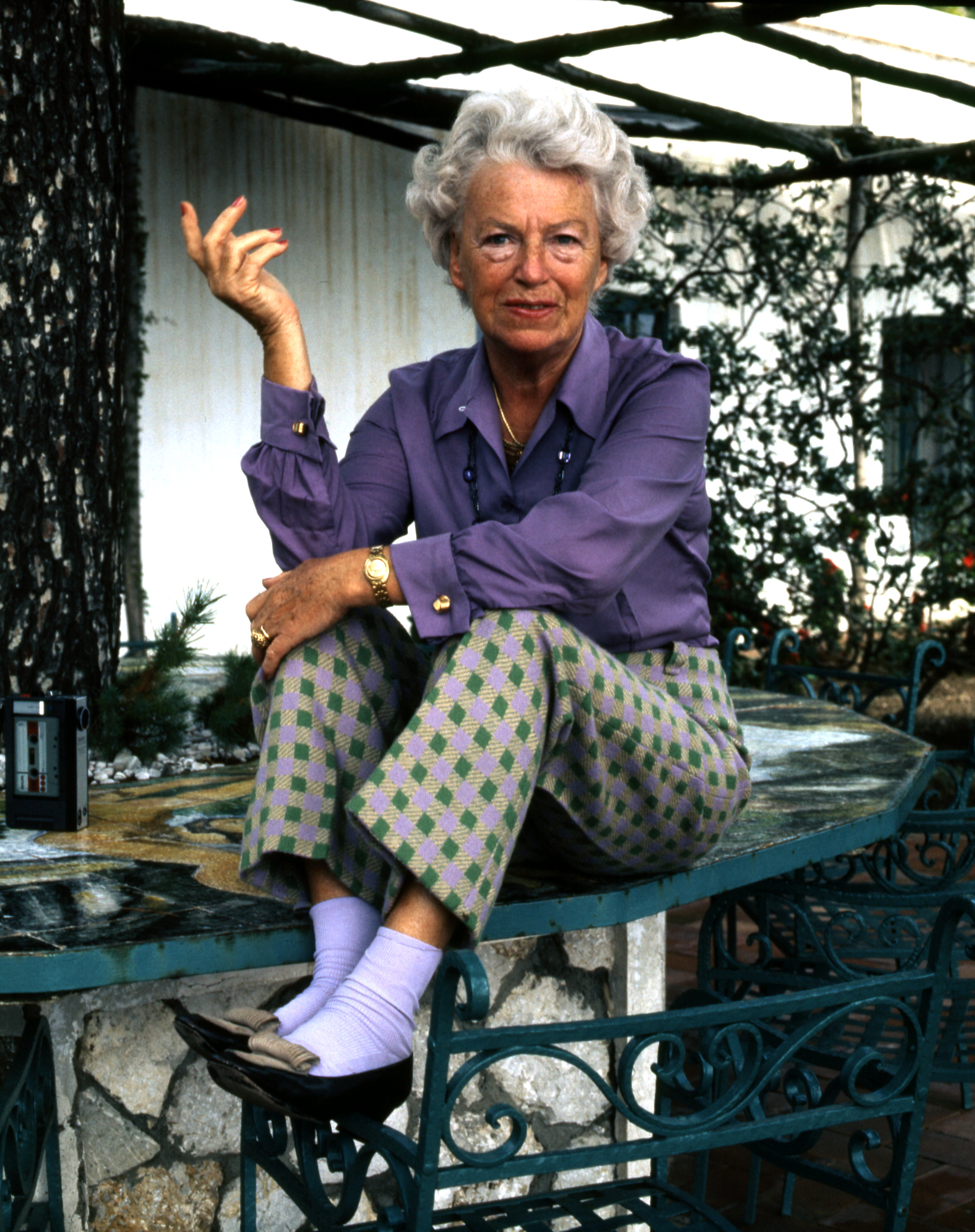
Gracie Fields

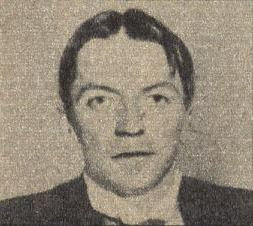
Kaj Munk

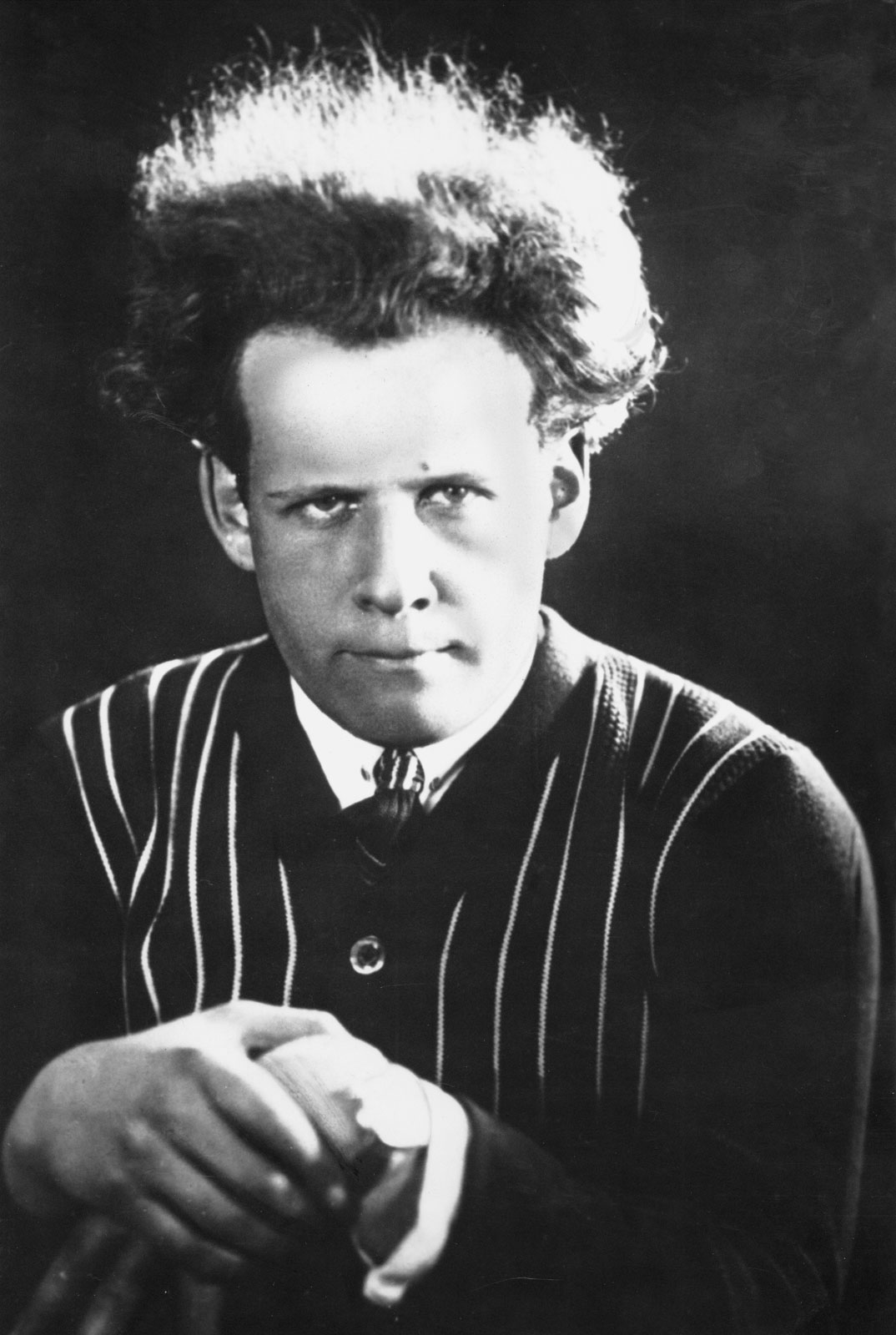
Sergei Eisenstein

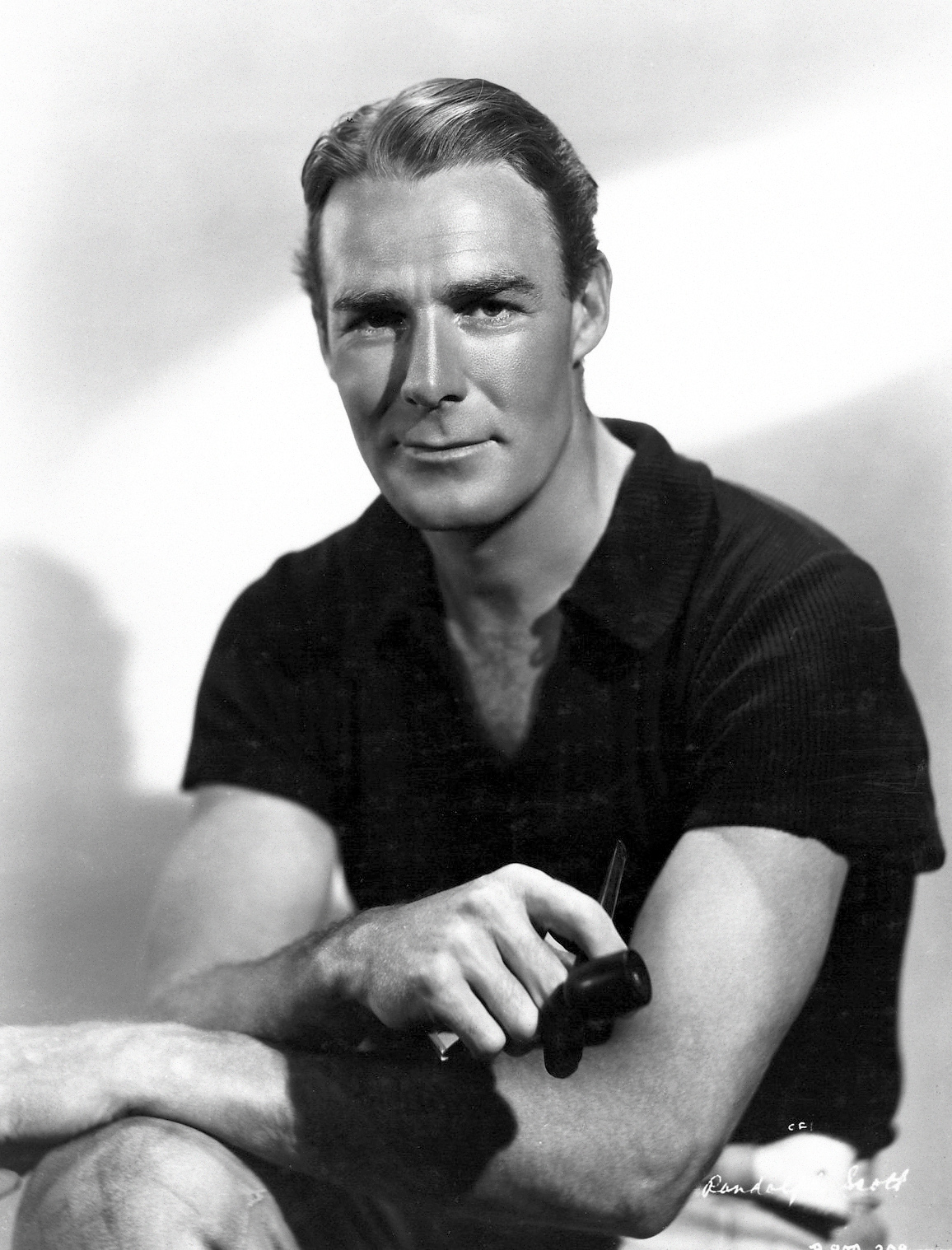
Randolph Scott

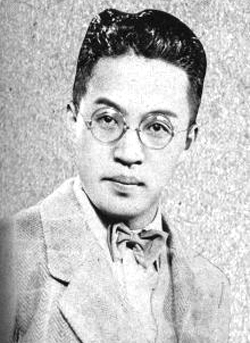
Denjirō Ōkōchi

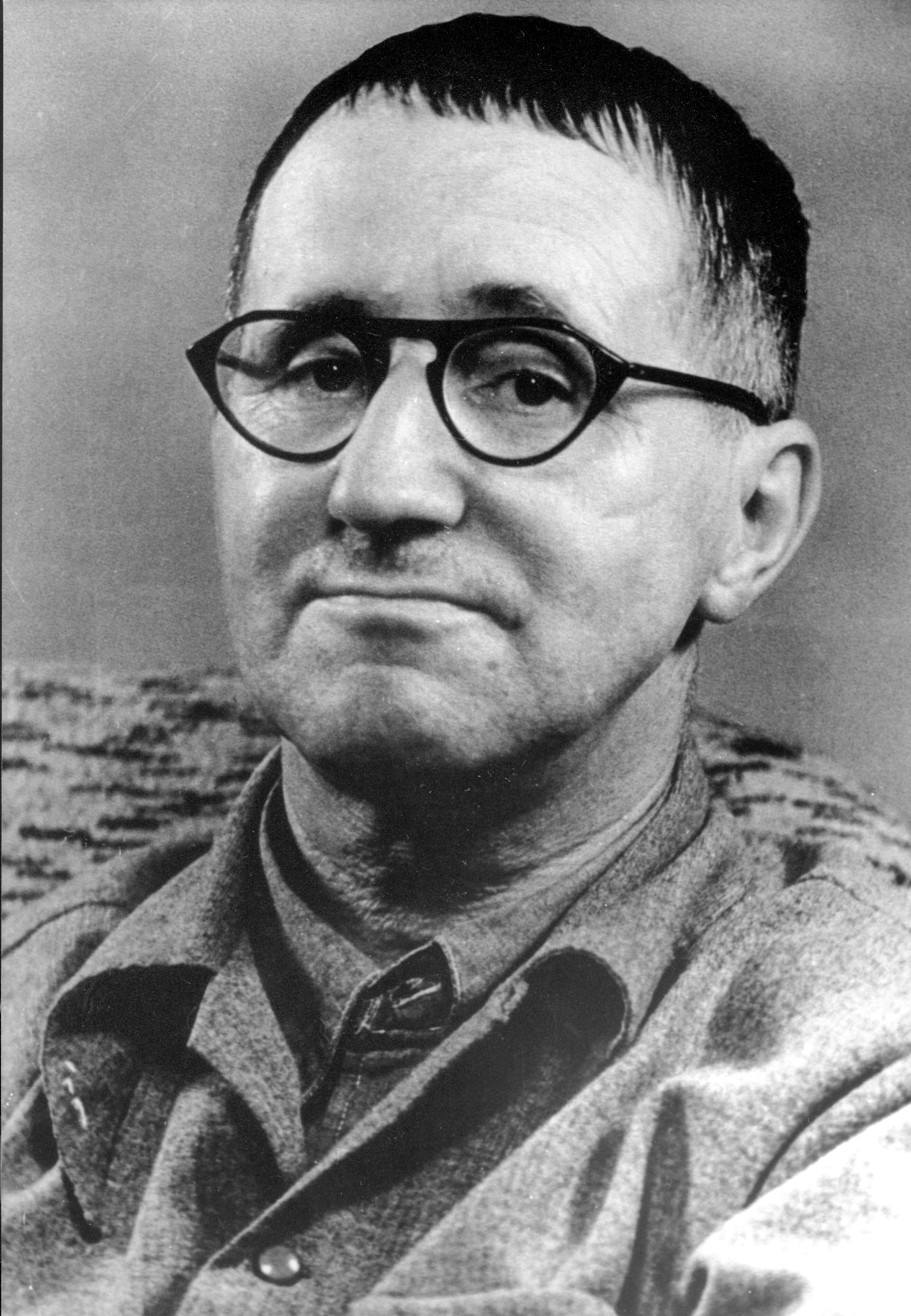
Bertolt Brecht

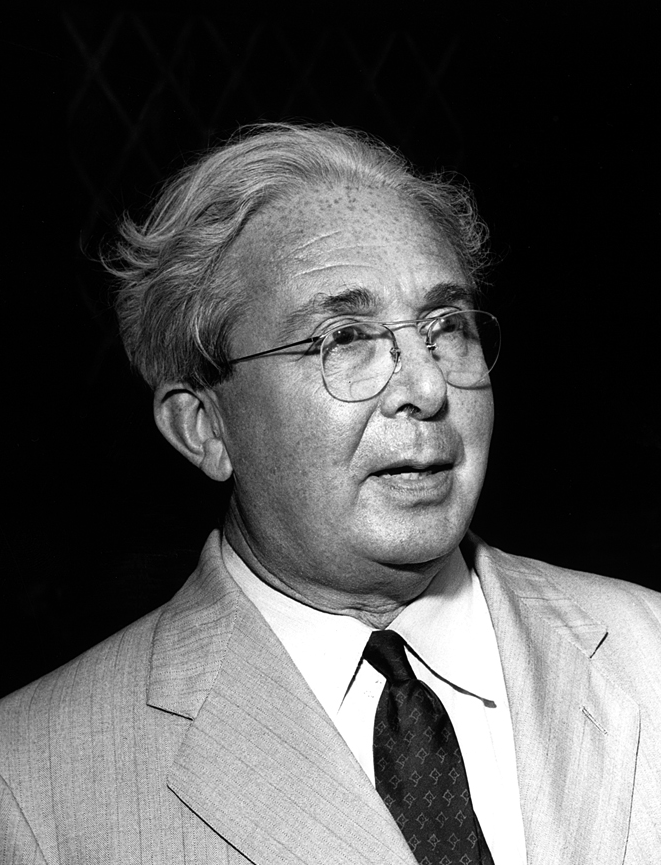
Leó Szilárd

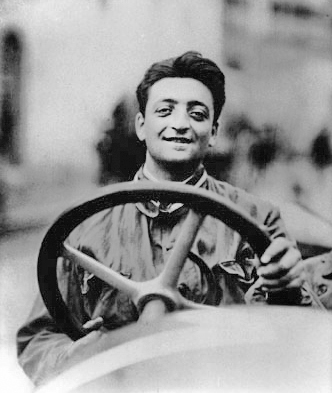
Enzo Ferrari

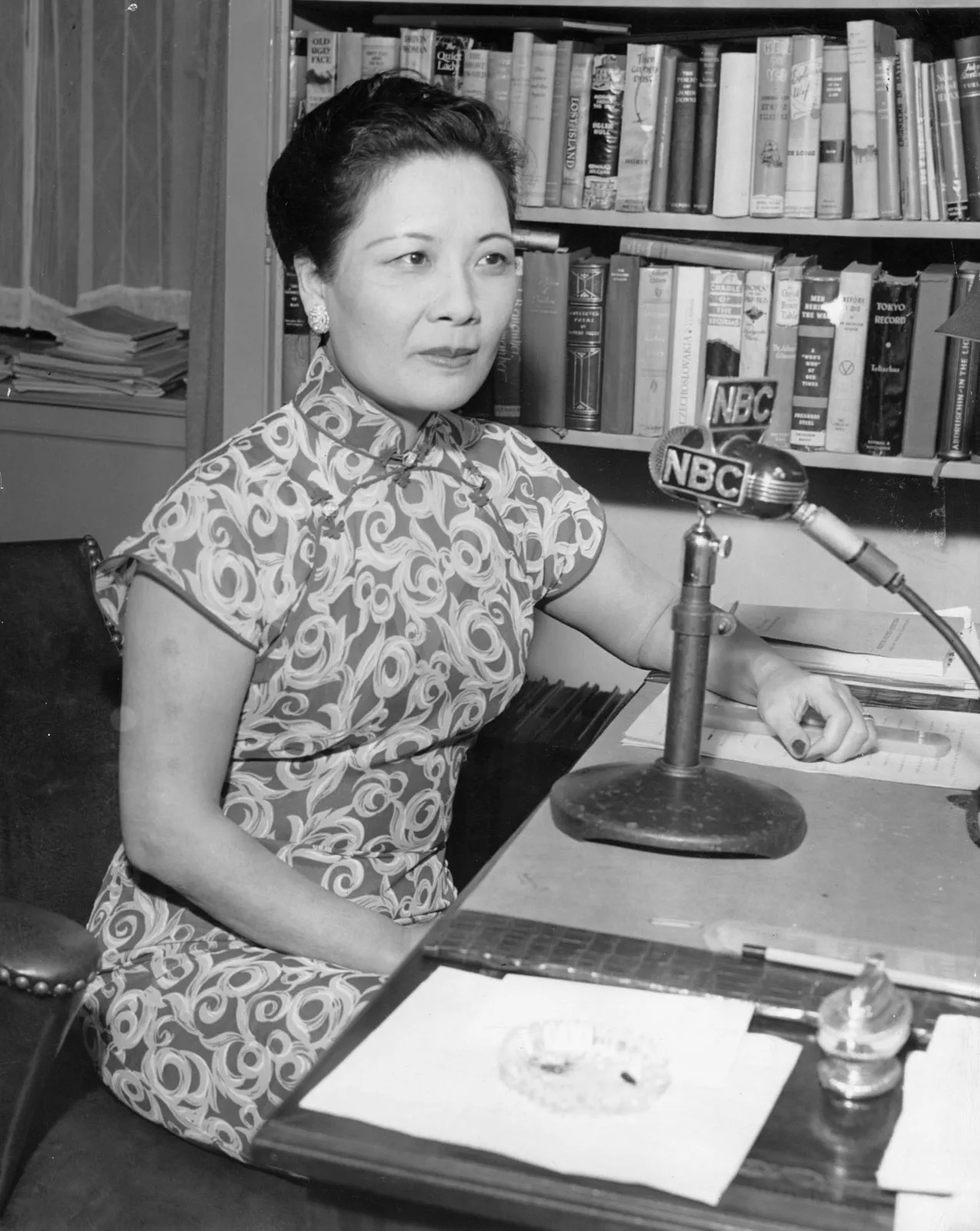
Soong Mei-ling

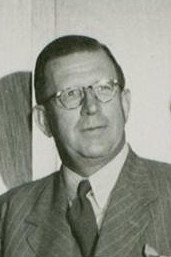
Eben Dönges

- January 1 – Viktor Ullmann, Austrian composer, conductor and pianist (d. 1944)
- January 3 – John Loder, British actor (d. 1988)
- January 6 – James Fitzmaurice, Irish aviation pioneer (d. 1965)
- January 7 – Art Baker, American actor (d. 1966)
- January 9 – Gracie Fields, British singer, actress and comedian (d. 1979)
- January 10 – Katharine Burr Blodgett, American physicist and chemist (d. 1979)
- January 13 – Kaj Munk, Danish playwright, Lutheran pastor and martyr (d. 1944)
- January 16 – Margaret Booth, American film editor (d. 2002)
- January 20 – Norma Varden, British-born American actress (d. 1989)
- January 21
  - Rudolph Maté, Polish-born American cinematographer (d. 1964)
  - Shah Ahmad Shah Qajar of Persia (d. 1930)
- January 22
  - Sergei Eisenstein, Russian and Soviet film director (d. 1948)
  - Elazar Shach, Lithuanian-born Israeli Haredi rabbi (d. 2001)
- January 23 – Randolph Scott, American film actor (d. 1987)
- January 24 – Karl Hermann Frank, German Nazi official, war criminal (d. 1946)
- January 25 – Hymie Weiss, Polish-American mob boss (d. 1926)
- January 28 – Milan Konjović, Serbian painter (d. 1993)
- January 31 – Hubert Renfro Knickerbocker, American journalist and author (d. 1949)

=== February ===
- February 1 – Leila Denmark, American pediatrician, supercentenarian (d. 2012)
- February 3 – Alvar Aalto, Finnish architect (d. 1976)
- February 5
  - Denjirō Ōkōchi, Japanese actor (d. 1962)
  - Ralph McGill, American journalist and editorialist (d.1969)
- February 6 – Melvin B. Tolson, American poet, educator, columnist, and politician (d. 1966)
- February 10
  - Bertolt Brecht, German writer (d. 1956)
  - Joseph Kessel, French journalist and author (d. 1979)
  - Margot Sponer, German philologist and resistance fighter (d. 1945)
- February 11
  - Henry de La Falaise, French film director, Croix de guerre recipient (d. 1972)
  - Leó Szilárd, Hungarian-American physicist (d. 1964)
- February 12
  - Wallace Ford, British actor (d. 1966)
  - Roy Harris, American composer (d. 1979)
- February 14
  - Eva Novak, American actress (d. 1988)
  - Fritz Zwicky, Swiss physicist, astronomer (d. 1974)
- February 15
  - Totò, Italian comedian, actor, poet, and songwriter (d. 1967)
  - Allen Woodring, American runner (d. 1982)
- February 18
  - Enzo Ferrari, Italian race car driver, automobile manufacturer (d. 1988)
  - Luis Muñoz Marín, Puerto Rican poet, journalist and politician (d. 1980)
- February 21
  - Ernest Born, American architect, designer, and artist (d. 1992)
- February 24 – Kurt Tank, German aeronautical engineer (d. 1983)
- February 25 – William Astbury, English physicist, molecular biologist (d. 1961)
- February 28
  - Hugh O'Flaherty, Irish Catholic priest (d. 1963)
  - Molly Picon, American actress, lyricist (d. 1992)

=== March ===
- March 2 – Amélia Rey Colaço, Portuguese actress and impresario (d. 1990)
- March 3 – Emil Artin, Austrian mathematician (d. 1962)
- March 4 – Georges Dumézil, French philologist (d. 1986)
- March 5
  - Zhou Enlai, Premier of China (d. 1976)
  - Soong Mei-ling, First Lady of China (d. 2003)
- March 6 – Therese Giehse, German actress (d. 1975)
- March 8 – Eben Dönges, acting Prime Minister of South Africa and elected President of South Africa (d. 1968)
- March 9 – Dudley Stamp, British geographer (d. 1966)
- March 11 – Dorothy Gish, American actress (d. 1968)
- March 13 – Henry Hathaway, American film director, producer (d. 1985)
- March 14 – Reginald Marsh, American painter (d. 1954)
- March 21 – Paul Alfred Weiss, Austrian biologist (d. 1989)
- March 23
  - Erich Bey, German admiral (d. 1943)
  - Madeleine de Bourbon-Busset, Duchess of Parma (d. 1984)
- March 30 – Joyce Carey, English actress (d. 1993)

=== April ===
Paul Robeson

- April 1 – William James Sidis, American mathematician (d. 1944)
- April 2 – Harindranath Chattopadhyay, Indian poet, actor and politician (d. 1990)
- April 3
  - George Jessel, American comedian (d. 1981)
  - Henry Luce, American magazine publisher (d. 1967)
- April 4 – Agnes Ayres, American actress (d. 1940)
- April 5 – Solange d'Ayen, French noblewoman, Duchess of Ayen and journalist (d. 1976)
- April 9
  - Paul Robeson, African-American actor, singer and political activist (d. 1976)
  - Atsushi Watanabe, Japanese film actor (d. 1977)
  - Therese Neumann, German Catholic mystic and stigmatic (d. 1962)
- April 12 – Lily Pons, French-American opera singer, actress (d. 1976)
- April 14
  - Lee Tracy, American actor (d. 1968)
  - Harold Stephen Black, American electrical engineer (d. 1983)
- April 19 – Constance Talmadge, American actress (d. 1973)
- April 26
  - Vicente Aleixandre, Spanish writer, Nobel Prize laureate (d. 1984)
  - John Grierson, Scottish documentary filmmaker (d. 1972)
  - Tomu Uchida, Japanese film director (d. 1970)
- April 27 – Ludwig Bemelmans, Austrian-American writer and illustrator (d. 1962)
- April 29 – E. J. Bowen, British chemist (d. 1980)

=== May ===
- May 2 – Henry Hall, British bandleader (d. 1989)
- May 3
  - Golda Meir, Prime Minister of Israel (d. 1978)
  - Septima Poinsette Clark, American educator and civil rights activist (d. 1987)
- May 5
  - Blind Willie McTell, American singer (d. 1959)
  - Hans Heinrich von Twardowski, German actor (d. 1958)
- May 6 – Konrad Henlein, Sudeten German Nazi leader (d. 1945)
- May 13 – Hisamuddin of Selangor, King of Malaysia (d. 1960)
- May 15
  - Arletty, French model, actress (d. 1992)
  - Tom Wintringham, British politician and historian (d. 1949)
- May 16 – Kenji Mizoguchi, Japanese film director (d. 1956)
- May 17
  - Anagarika Govinda, German buddhist lama (d. 1985)
  - A. J. Casson, Canadian painter (d. 1992)
- May 19 – Julius Evola, Italian philosopher (d. 1974)
- May 21 – Armand Hammer, American entrepreneur, art collector (d. 1990)
- May 23
  - Frank McHugh, American actor (d. 1981)
  - Josef Terboven, German Nazi politician, Reichskommissar for Norway 1940–1945 (d. 1945)
- May 24 – Helen B. Taussig, American cardiologist (d. 1986)
- May 25 – Robert Aron, French historian and writer (d. 1975)
- May 28 – Andy Kirk, American jazz bandleader and saxophonist (d.1992)
- May 31 – Norman Vincent Peale, American clergyman (d. 1993)

=== June ===
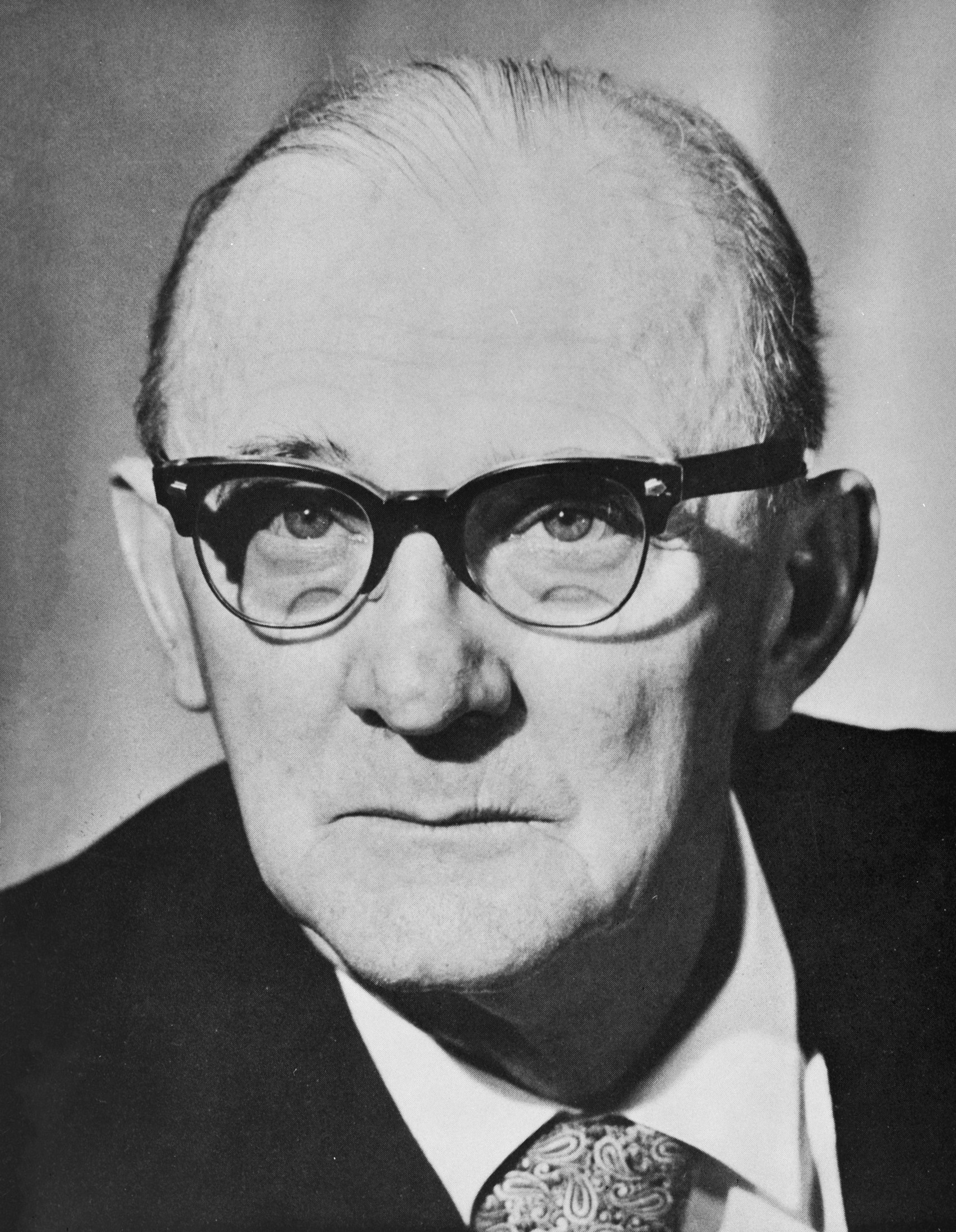
Jim Fouché

- June 3 – Stuart H. Ingersoll, American admiral (d. 1983)
- June 4 – Harry Crosby, American publisher, poet (d. 1929)
- June 5 – Federico García Lorca, Spanish poet, playwright (d. 1936)
- June 6
  - Ninette de Valois, Irish dancer, founder of The Royal Ballet (d. 2001)
  - Jim Fouché, 5th President of South Africa (d. 1980)
- June 10 – Michel Hollard, French Resistance hero (d. 1993)
- June 11 – Lionel Penrose, English geneticist (d. 1972)
- June 17
  - M. C. Escher, Dutch artist (d. 1972)
  - Harry Patch, British World War I soldier, the last Tommy (d. 2009)
- June 22
  - Weeratunge Edward Perera, Malaysian educator, businessman and social entrepreneur (d. 1982)
  - Erich Maria Remarque, German writer (d. 1970)
- June 23 – Winifred Holtby, English novelist and journalist (d. 1935)
- June 26
  - Sa`id Al-Mufti, 3-time prime minister of Jordan (d. 1989)
  - Willy Messerschmitt, German aircraft designer, manufacturer (d. 1978)
- June 30
  - George Chandler, American actor (d. 1985)
  - Josef Jakobs, German spy (d.1941)

=== July ===
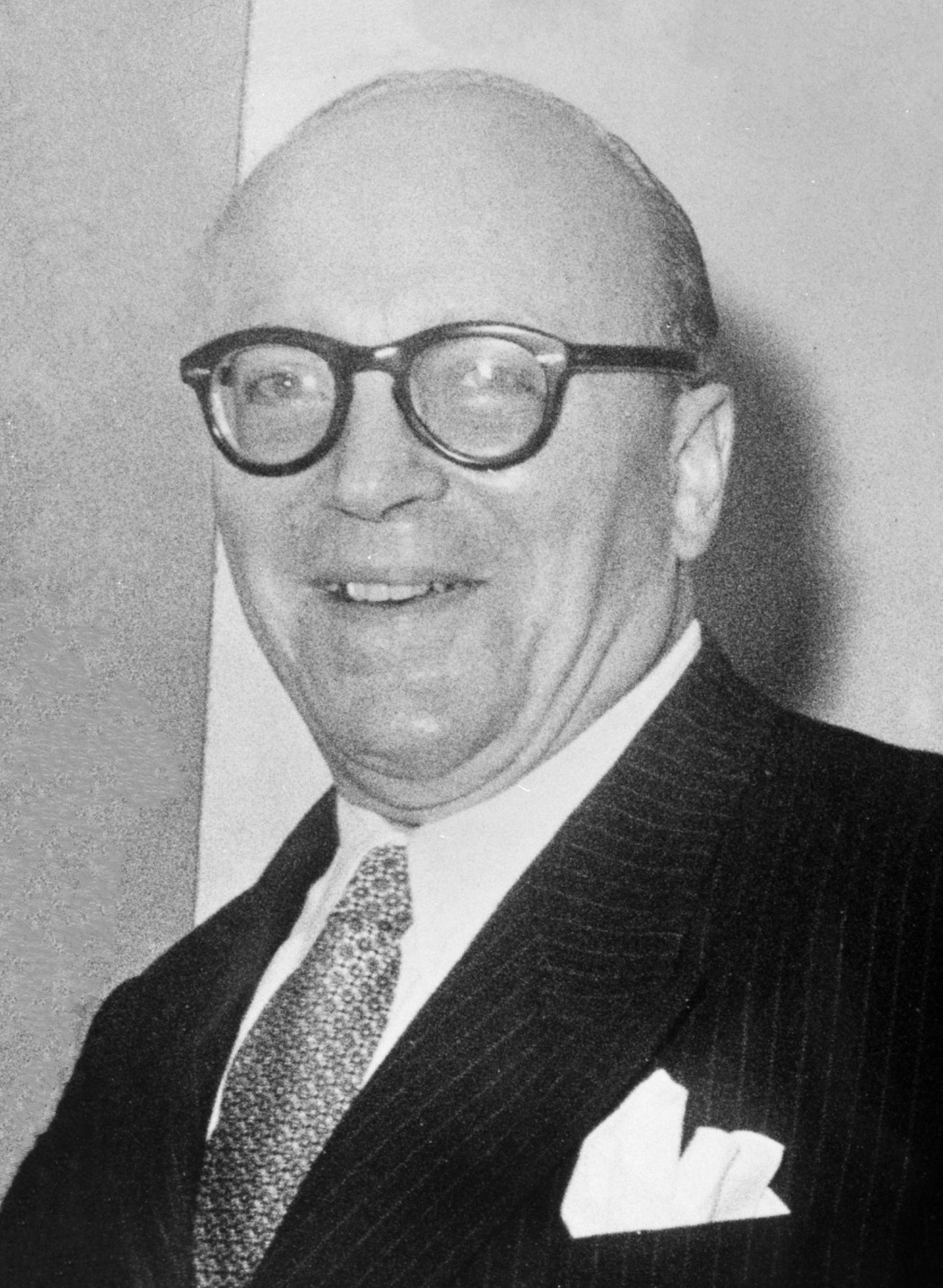
Stefanos Stefanopoulos

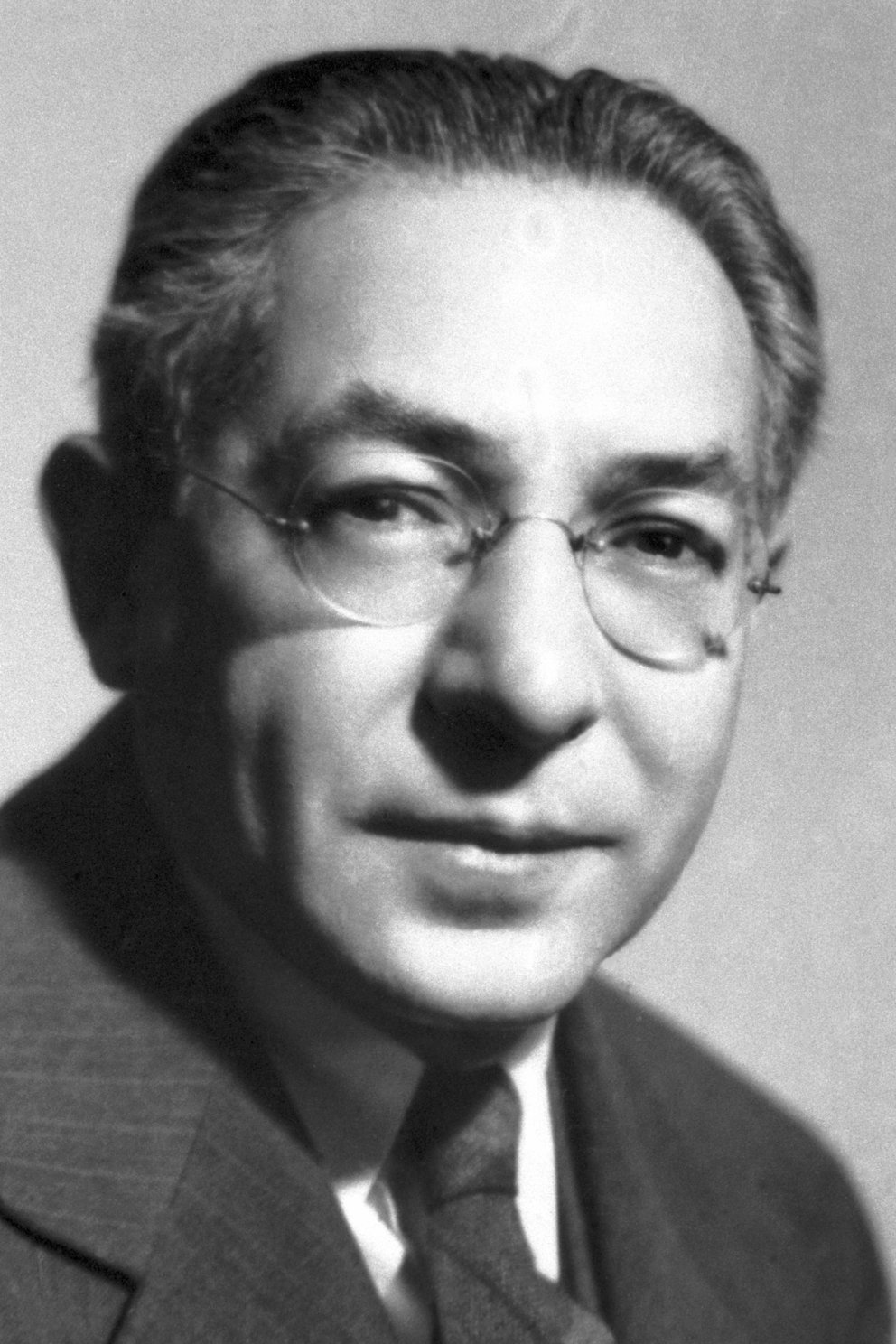
Isidor Isaac Rabi

- July 2
  - George J. Folsey, American cinematographer (d. 1988)
  - Anthony McAuliffe, American general (d. 1975)
- July 3
  - Donald Healey, English motor engineer, race car driver (d. 1988)
  - Stefanos Stefanopoulos, Prime Minister of Greece (d. 1982)
- July 4
  - Gulzarilal Nanda, Indian politician, economist (d. 1998)
  - Gertrude Lawrence, English actress, singer (d. 1952)
- July 6 – Hanns Eisler, German composer (d. 1962)
- July 7
  - Teresa Hsu Chih, Chinese-born Singaporean social worker, supercentenarian (d. 2011)
  - Arnold Horween, American Harvard Crimson, NFL football player (d. 1985)
- July 8 – Vic Oliver, Austrian-born British actor and radio comedian (d. 1964)
- July 14
  - Happy Chandler, American politician (d. 1991)
  - Youssef Wahbi, Egyptian actor, film director (d. 1982)
- July 17 – Berenice Abbott, American photographer (d. 1991)
- July 18 – John Stuart, Scottish actor (d. 1979)
- July 22
  - Stephen Vincent Benét, American writer (d. 1943)
  - Alexander Calder, American artist (d. 1976)
- July 25 – Arthur Lubin, American film director (d. 1995)
- July 29 – Isidor Isaac Rabi, American physicist, Nobel Prize laureate (d. 1988)
- July 30 – Henry Moore, English sculptor (d. 1986)

=== August ===
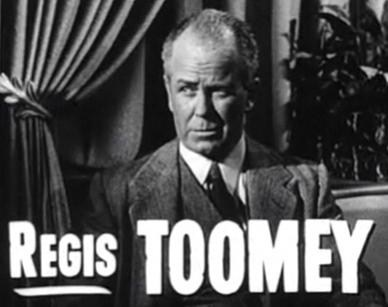
Regis Toomey

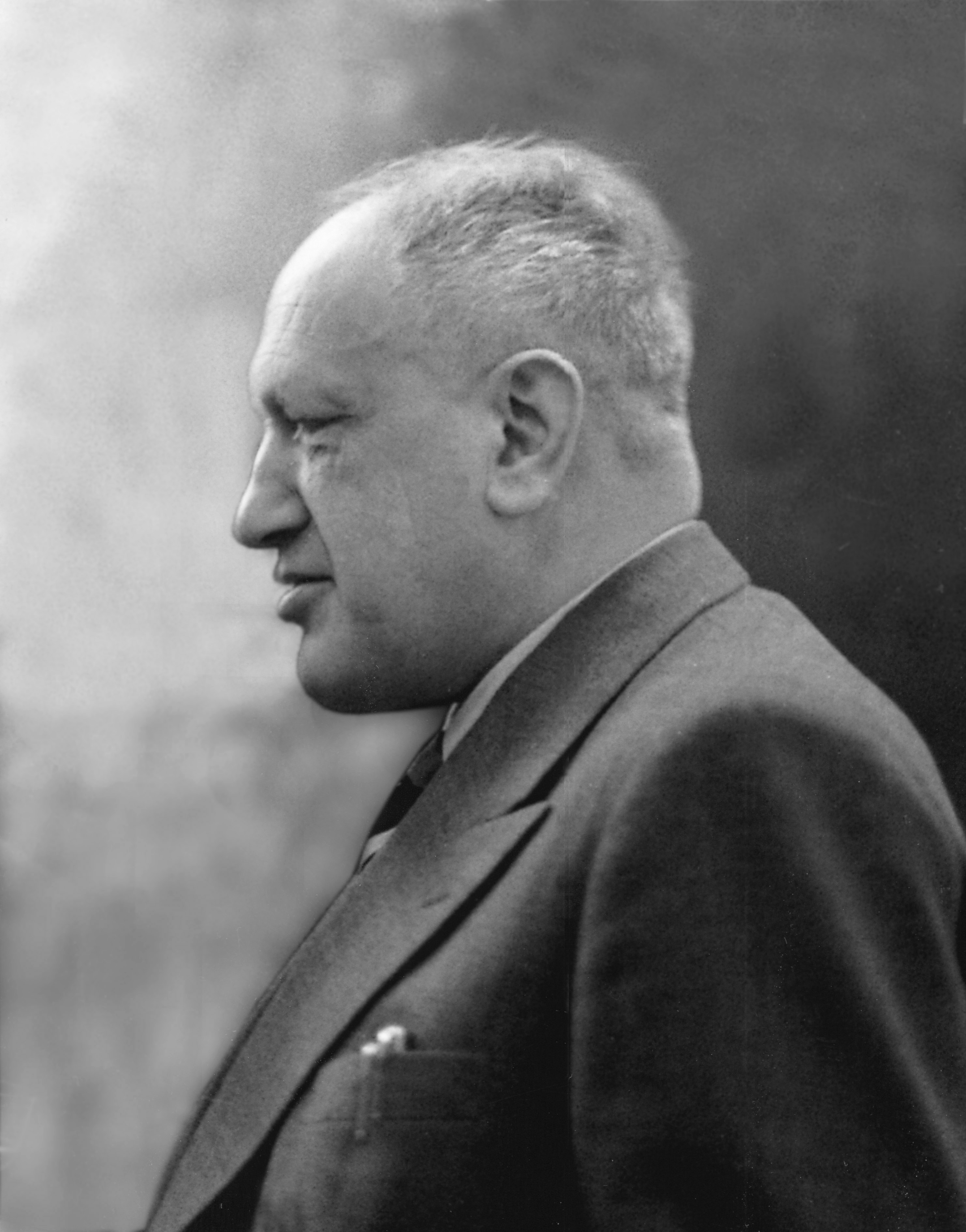
Leopold Infeld

- August 5 – Piero Sraffa, Italian political economist (d. 1983)
- August 11
  - Peter Mohr Dam, 2-time prime minister of the Faroe Islands (d. 1968)
  - Karolina Lanckorońska, Polish noblewoman, World War II resistance fighter, philanthropist, and historian. (d. 2002)
- August 12
  - Maria Klenova, Russian marine geologist (d. 1976)
  - Oscar Homolka, Austrian actor (d. 1978)
- August 13
  - Mohamad Noah Omar, Malaysian politician (d. 1991)
  - Regis Toomey, American actor (d. 1991)
- August 15
  - Jan Brzechwa, Polish poet (d. 1966)
  - Mohan Singh Oberoi, Indian businessman and politician (d. 2002)
- August 18
  - Lance Sharkey, Australian Communist leader (d. 1967)
  - Tsola Dragoycheva, Bulgarian politician (d. 1993)
- August 19 – Eleanor Boardman, American actress (d. 1991)
- August 20
  - Leopold Infeld, Polish physicist (d. 1968)
  - Vilhelm Moberg, Swedish novelist, historian (d. 1973)
- August 21 – Herbert Mundin, English actor (d. 1939)
- August 26 – Peggy Guggenheim, American art collector (d. 1979)
- August 27 – John Hamilton, Canadian criminal, bank robber (d. 1934)
- August 29 – Preston Sturges, American director, writer (d. 1959)
- August 30 – Shirley Booth, American actress (d. 1992)

=== September ===
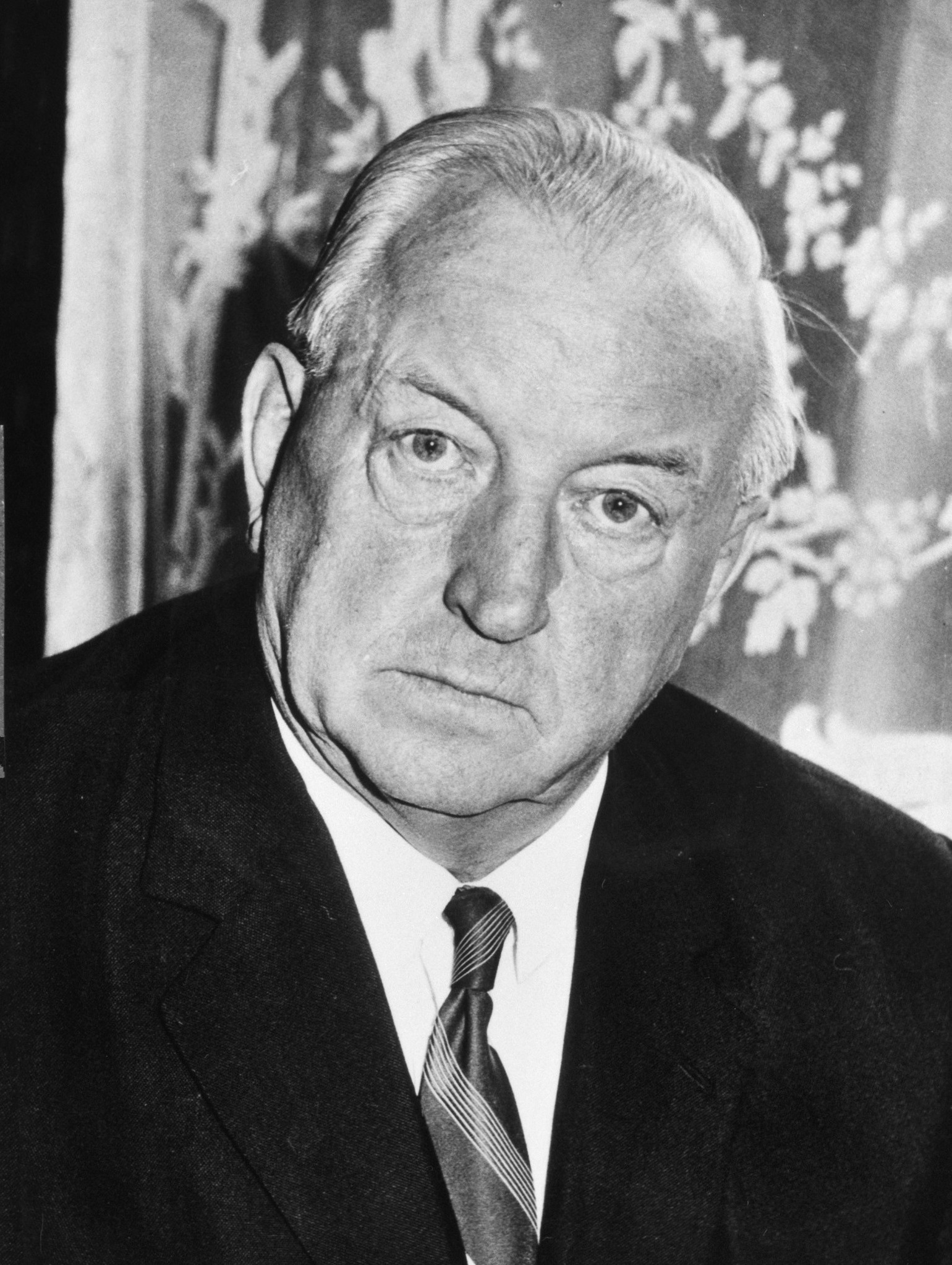
Alfons Gorbach

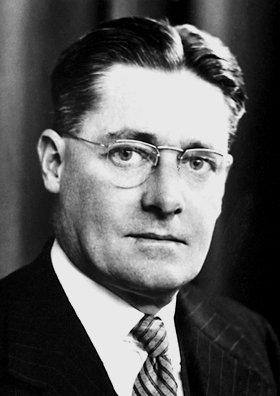
Howard Florey

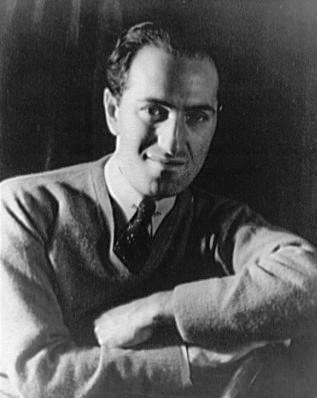
George Gershwin

- September 1
  - Violet Carson, British actress (d. 1983)
  - Marilyn Miller, American actress, singer, and dancer (d. 1936)
- September 2 – Alfons Gorbach, 15th Chancellor of Austria (d. 1972)
- September 9 – Walter B. Rea, American university administrator and basketball player (d. 1970)
- September 10
  - George Eldredge, American actor (d. 1977)
  - Bessie Love, American actress (d. 1986)
- September 13
  - László Baky, Hungarian Nazi leader (d. 1946)
  - Emilio Núñez Portuondo, Cuban diplomat, lawyer and politician, 13th Prime Minister of Cuba (d. 1978)
- September 19 – Giuseppe Saragat, President of Italy (d. 1988)
- September 24 – Howard Florey, Australian-born pharmacologist, recipient of the Nobel Prize in Physiology or Medicine (d. 1968)
- September 26 – George Gershwin, American composer (d. 1937)
- September 28 – Mijo Mirković, Croatian economist and author (d. 1963)
- September 29 – Trofim Lysenko, Russian biologist (d. 1976)
- September 30
  - Renée Adorée, French actress (d. 1933)
  - Princess Charlotte, Duchess of Valentinois (d. 1977), Monégasque princess

=== October ===
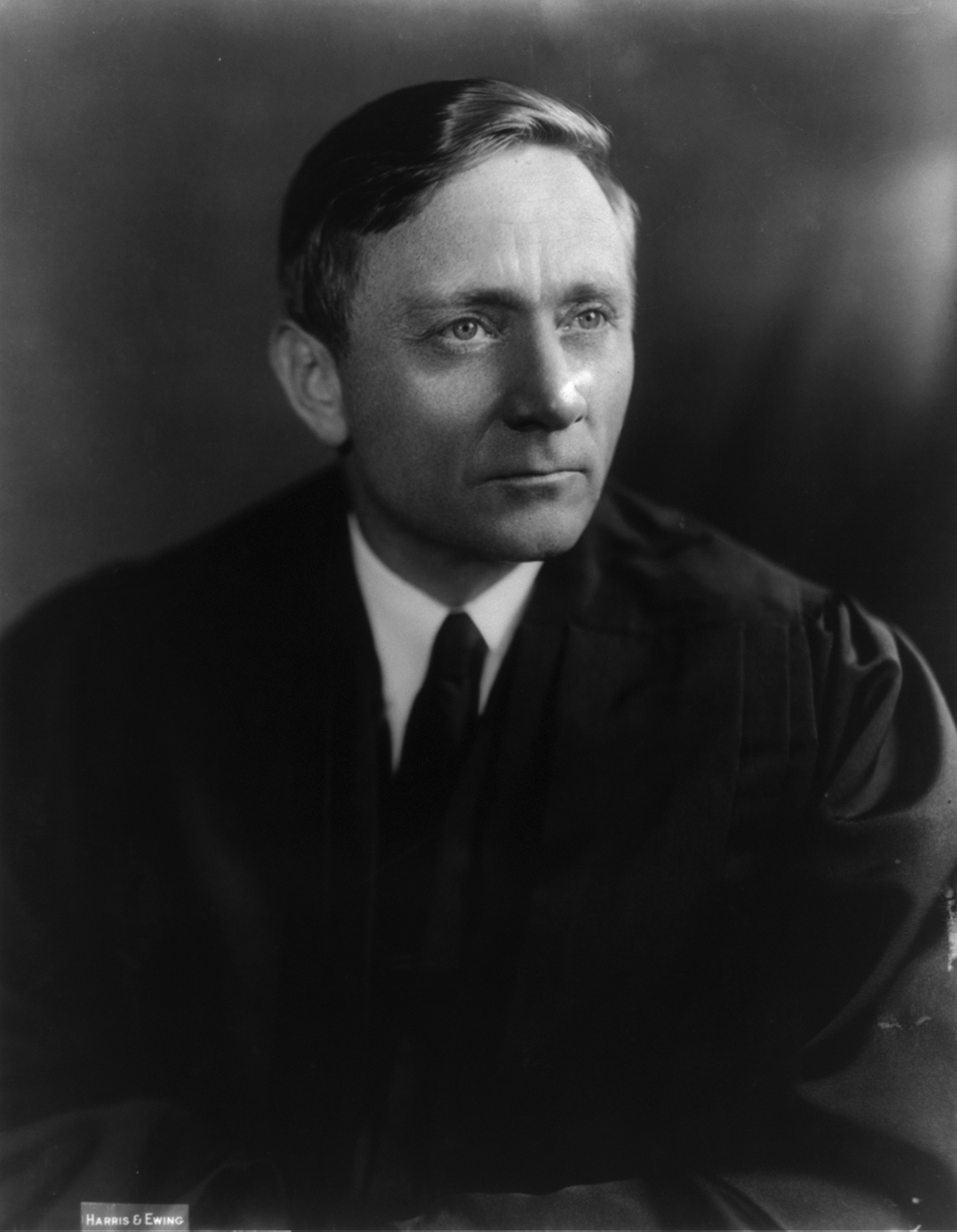
William O. Douglas

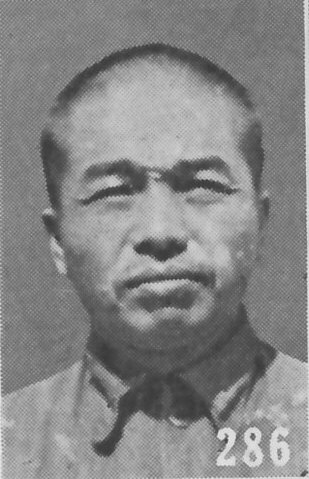
Peng Dehuai

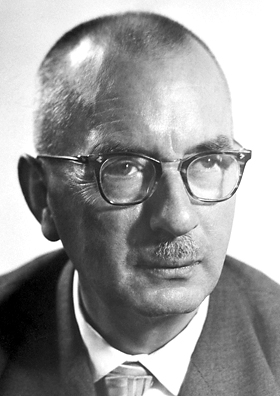
Karl Ziegler

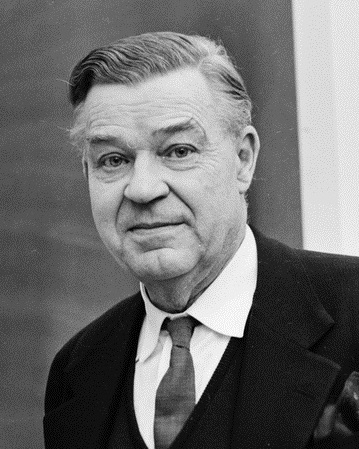
Gunnar Myrdal

- October 6
  - Arthur G. Jones-Williams, British aviator (d. 1929)
  - Mitchell Leisen, American film director (d. 1972)
  - Clarence Williams, American jazz pianist, composer (d. 1965)
- October 9 – Joe Sewell, American professional baseball player (d. 1990)
- October 10
  - Lilly Daché, French milliner (d. 1989)
  - Marie-Pierre Kœnig, French general, politician (d. 1970)
- October 16 – William O. Douglas, Associate Justice of the Supreme Court of the United States (d. 1980)
- October 17 – Shinichi Suzuki, Japanese musician, educator (d. 1998)
- October 18 – Lotte Lenya, Austrian actress, singer (d. 1981)
- October 24 – Peng Dehuai, Chinese military leader (d. 1974)
- October 28 – Abdul Khalek Hassouna, Egyptian diplomat, 2nd Secretary-General of the Arab League (d. 1992)
- October 29 – Vera Stanley Alder, English painter and mystic (d. 1984)
- October 30 – Raphael Girard, Swiss-Guatemalan ethnographer (d. 1982)

=== November ===
- November 11 – René Clair, French filmmaker, novelist, and non-fiction writer (d. 1981)
- November 12
  - Leon Štukelj, Slovene gymnast (d. 1999)
  - Henryk Sucharski, Polish military officer (d. 1946)
- November 13 – Walter Karig, American naval captain and author (d. 1956)
- November 14 – Benjamin Fondane, Romanian-French Symbolist poet, critic and existentialist philosopher (d. 1944)
- November 15 – Sylvan Goldman, American businessman and inventor (d. 1984)
- November 17 – Colleen Clifford, Australian actress (d. 1996)
- November 18 – Joris Ivens, Dutch director (d. 1989)
- November 21 – René Magritte, Belgian artist (d. 1967)
- November 22
  - Gabriel González Videla, 24th president of Chile (d. 1980)
  - Piotr Triebler, Polish sculptor (d. 1952)
- November 23 – Bess Flowers, American actress (d. 1984)
- November 24 – Liu Shaoqi, President of China (d. 1969)
- November 26 – Karl Ziegler, German chemist, Nobel Prize laureate (d. 1973)
- November 29 – C. S. Lewis, British author (d. 1963)
- November 30
  - Firpo Marberry, American baseball pitcher (d. 1976)
  - Link Lyman, American professional football player (d. 1972)

=== December ===
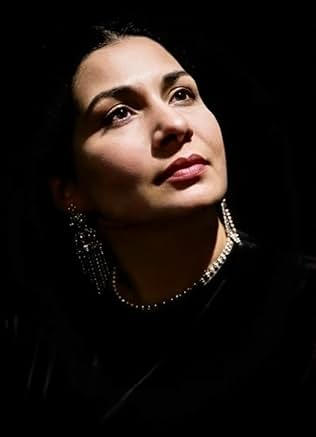
Umm Kulthum

- December 2 – Indra Lal Roy, Indian World War I pilot (d. 1918)
- December 5 – Grace Moore, American opera singer, actress (d. 1947)
- December 6
  - Alfred Eisenstaedt, American photojournalist (d. 1995)
  - Gunnar Myrdal, Swedish sociologist, economist and Nobel Prize laureate (d. 1987)
- December 9 – Emmett Kelly, American circus clown (d. 1979)
- December 10 – Howard Beale, Australian politician and diplomat (d. 1983)
- December 14 – Lillian Randolph, American actress, singer (d. 1980)
- December 19 – Zheng Zhenduo, Chinese author, translator (d. 1958)
- December 20 – Irene Dunne, American actress (d. 1990)
- December 24 – Baby Dodds, American jazz drummer (d. 1959)
- December 27 – Inejiro Asanuma, Japanese politician (d. 1960)
- December 28 – Shigematsu Sakaibara, Japanese admiral and war criminal (d. 1947)
- December 31
  - István Dobi, Hungarian prime minister (d. 1968)
  - Ivan Miller, Canadian journalist and sportscaster (d. 1967)
  - Krishna Ballabh Sahay, Indian freedom fighter (d. 1974)
  - Umm Kulthum, Egyptian singer and actress (died 1975)

=== Unknown date ===
- Robert Piguet, Swiss-born, Paris-based fashion designer (d. 1953)

== Deaths ==
=== January–June ===
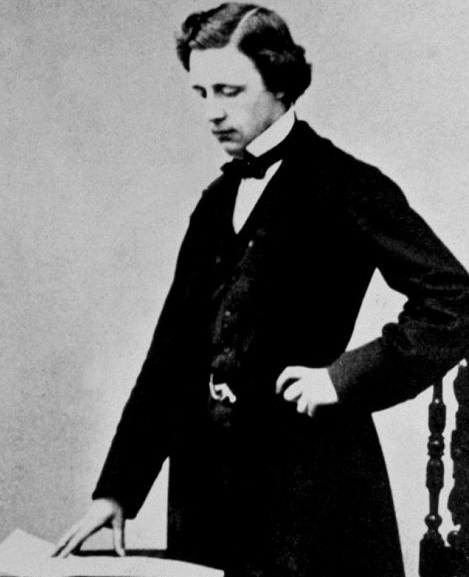
Lewis Carroll

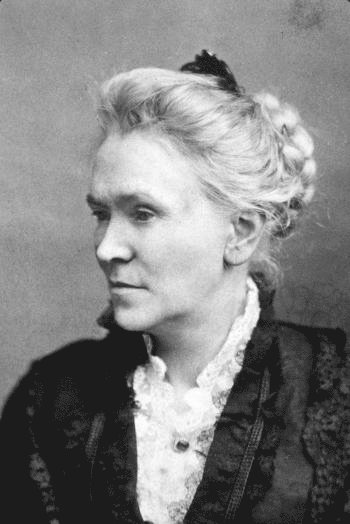
Matilda Joslyn Gage

William Ewart Gladstone

- January 3 – Lawrence Sullivan Ross, Confederate brigadier general, Texas governor, and president of Texas A&M University (b. 1838)
- January 14 – Lewis Carroll, British writer, mathematician (Alice in Wonderland) (b. 1832)
- January 16 – Charles Pelham Villiers, longest-serving MP in the British House of Commons (b. 1802)
- January 18 – Henry Liddell, English Dean of Christ Church, Oxford (b. 1811)
- January 26 – Cornelia J. M. Jordan, American lyricist (b. 1830)
- February 1 – Tsuboi Kōzō, Japanese admiral (b. 1843)
- February 6 – Abdul Samad of Selangor, Malaysian ruler, 4th Sultan of Selangor (b. 1804)
- February 16 – Thomas Bracken, author of the official national anthem of New Zealand (God Defend New Zealand) (b. 1843)
- March 1 – George Bruce Malleson, Indian officer, author (b. 1825)
- March 6 – Andrei Alexandrovich Popov, Russian admiral (b. 1821)
- March 10
  - Marie-Eugénie de Jésus, French religious (b. 1817)
  - George Müller, Prussian evangelist, founder of the Ashley Down orphanage (b. 1805)
- March 11 – William Rosecrans, California congressman, Register of the U.S. Treasury (b. 1819)
- March 15 – Sir Henry Bessemer, British engineer, inventor (b. 1813)
- March 16 – Aubrey Beardsley, British artist (b. 1872)
- March 18 – Matilda Joslyn Gage, American feminist (b. 1826)
- March 27 – Sir Syed Ahmad Khan, Indian university founder (b. 1817)
- March 28 – Anton Seidl, Hungarian conductor (b. 1850)
- April 13 – Aurilla Furber, American author (b. 1847)
- April 15 – Te Keepa Te Rangihiwinui, Maori military leader
- April 18 – Gustave Moreau, French painter (b. 1826)
- April 29 – Mary Towne Burt, American benefactor (b. 1842)
- May 1 – Luis Cadarso y Rey de Andrade, Spanish naval officer (killed in action) (b. 1843)
- May 19 – William Ewart Gladstone, Prime Minister of the United Kingdom (b. 1809)
- May 22 – Edward Bellamy, American author (b. 1850)
- May 29 – Theodor Eimer, German zoologist (b. 1843)
- June 4 – Rosalie Olivecrona, Swedish feminist activist (b. 1823)
- June 10 – Tuone Udaina, Croatian-Italian last speaker of the Dalmatian language (b. 1821)
- June 14 – Dewitt Clinton Senter, American politician, 18th Governor of Tennessee (b. 1830)
- June 25 – Ferdinand Cohn, German biologist, bacteriologist and microbiologist (b. 1828)

=== July–December ===
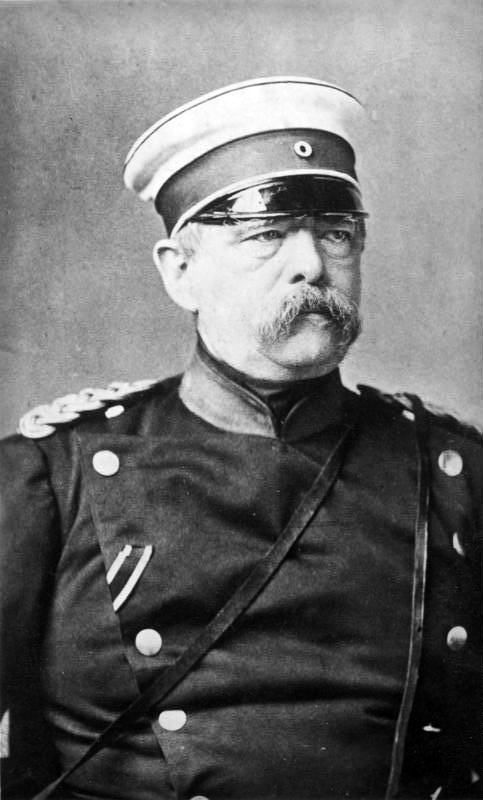
Otto von Bismarck

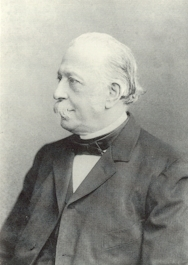
Theodor Fontane

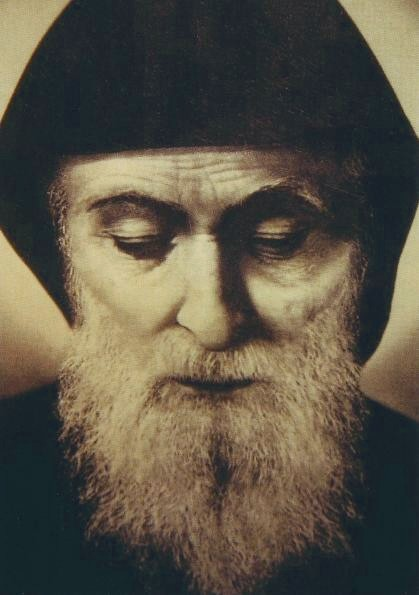
Saint Charbel Makhluf

- July 1
  - Siegfried Marcus, Austrian automobile pioneer (b. 1831)
  - Joaquín Vara de Rey y Rubio, Spanish general (killed in action) (b. 1841)
- July 3 – Fernando Villaamil, Spanish naval officer (killed in action) (b. 1845)
- July 5 – Richard Pankhurst, English lawyer, radical and supporter of women's rights (b. 1834)
- July 8 – Soapy Smith, American con artist and gangster (b. 1860)
- July 14 – Louis-François Richer Laflèche, Roman Catholic Bishop of Trois-Rivières, Native American missionary (b. 1818)
- July 30 – Otto von Bismarck, German statesman (b. 1815)
- August 8 – Eugène Boudin, French painter (b. 1824)
- August 11 – Sophia Braeunlich, American business manager (b. 1854)
- August 23 – Félicien Rops, Belgian artist (b. 1833)
- September 2 – Wilford Woodruff, fourth president of the Church of Jesus Christ of Latter-day Saints (b. 1807)
- September 5 – Sarah Emma Edmonds, Canadian nurse, spy (b. 1841)
- September 9 – Stéphane Mallarmé, French poet (b. 1842)
- September 10 – Empress Elisabeth of Austria, empress consort of Austria, queen consort of Hungary (assassinated) (b. 1837)
- September 16 – Ramón Emeterio Betances, Puerto Rican politician, medical doctor and diplomat (b. 1827)
- September 19 – Sir George Grey, 11th Premier of New Zealand (b. 1812)
- September 20 – Theodor Fontane, German writer (b. 1819)
- September 26 – Fanny Davenport, American actress (b. 1850)
- September 28 – Tan Sitong, Chinese revolutionary (executed) (b. 1865)
- September 29 – Louise of Hesse-Kassel, German princess, queen consort of Christian IX of Denmark (b. 1817)
- October 24 – Pierre Puvis de Chavannes, French painter (b. 1824)
- November 2 – George Goyder, surveyor-general of South Australia (b. 1826)
- November 20 – Sir John Fowler, British civil engineer (b. 1817)
- December 8 – Hugh Ryves Baker, Church of England priest and founder of St Michael's Woolwich (b. 1832)
- December 24 – Charbel Makhluf, Lebanese Maronite, Roman Catholic and Eastern Catholic monk, priest and saint (b. 1828)
- December 25 – Laura Gundersen, Norwegian actress (b. 1832)
- December 29 – Ilia Solomonovich Abelman, Russian astronomer (b. 1866)

=== Date unknown ===
- Sotirios Sotiropoulos, Greek economist, politician (b. 1831)

== Sources ==
- Morro Castle, Havana Harbor. 00694250. Thomas Edison. "Filmed ca. March 17 to April 1, 1898" Morro Castle (fortress) downloadable videos. (1898 Morro Castle, Havana Harbor, YouTube stream. Thomas Edison. Archived from the original on March 5, 2016. needs Flash)
- 1898 U S Battleship Indiana. Thomas Edison. Archived from the original on December 11, 2021. view of USS Indiana (BB-1) (needs Flash)
- 1898 Transport Ship Whitney Leaving Dock. Thomas Edison. Archived from the original on December 11, 2021. "1898-05-20" (needs Flash)
- 1898 10th U.S. Infantry, 2nd Battalion leaving Train. Thomas Edison. Archived from the original on December 11, 2021. "1898-05-20" view of 10th U.S. Infantry, 2nd Battalion (needs Flash)
- 1898 U.S. Cavalry Supplies Unloading at Tampa, Florida. Thomas Edison. Archived from the original on December 11, 2021. "1898-05-20" view of Tampa, Florida (needs Flash)
- 1898 Military Camp at Tampa, taken from train. Thomas Edison. Archived from the original on December 11, 2021. "1898-05-20" view of Tampa, Florida (needs Flash)
- 1898 Cuban Refugees Waiting for Rations. Thomas Edison. Archived from the original on December 11, 2021. "1898-05-20" (needs Flash)
- 1898 Colored Troops Disembarking. Thomas Edison. Archived from the original on December 11, 2021. "1898-05-20" (needs Flash)
- 1898 Troops Ship for the Philippines. Thomas Edison. Archived from the original on December 11, 2021. "June 1898" (needs Flash)
- 1898 U.S. troops landing at Daiquirí, Cuba. Thomas Edison. Archived from the original on December 11, 2021. "1898-08-05" view of Daiquirí after the United States invasion of Cuba in the Spanish–American War (needs Flash)
- 1898 Major General Shafter. Thomas Edison. Archived from the original on December 11, 2021. "1898-08-05" view of Major General Shafter (needs Flash)
- 1898 Troops making road in front of Santiago. Thomas Edison. Archived from the original on December 11, 2021. "1898-09-03" view of Santiago (needs Flash)
