= Kubok Obschestva Velosipednoy Ezdy =

The Kubok Obschestva Velosipednoy Ezdy(Bicycle Ride Society Cup) or Gonka Motorov(Race of engines) was a Grand Prix motor race held in Russian Empire on October 11, 1898.

== Track ==
The first motor race in Russia had begun outside of Saint Petersburg near the Alexandrovskaya railway station. Drivers reached Strelna and then went back to Aleksandrovo for a total distance of 41 kilometres (25 mi). It was difficult to drive that day, because the road was covered with snow.

== Competitors ==
Seven cars were ready to start the race. The first starter was V.I. von Lode, but his car collided with a horse. The second starter was Shneyderov, then Stepanov started. Pavel Belyaev was 4th, and Louis Mazy 5th. Alfonso Merl of France started after Mazi. These six starters each used a Clement car. The last starter, Lavrentyev, used a Benz car. It was heavier than 98 kilograms (216 lb), which is why his car was not classified. Its weight was about 848 kilograms (1,870 lb).

== Classification ==
Pos	Driver	Constructor	Time/Retired
1	(Russia) Pavel Belyaev (RUS)	Clement	1:33:36
2	(France) Alfonso Merl (FRA)	Clement	1:45.36
3	(Russia) S.A. Stepanov (RUS)	Clement	1:49.24
4	(Russia) Shneyderov (RUS)	Clement	2:04:00.
DNQ	(Russia) Lavrentyev (RUS)	Benz	2:11:00
Ret	(France) Louis Mazy (FRA)	Clement	Engine
Ret	(Russia) V.I. von Lode (RUS)	Clement	Accident
