= Mathias Énard bibliography =

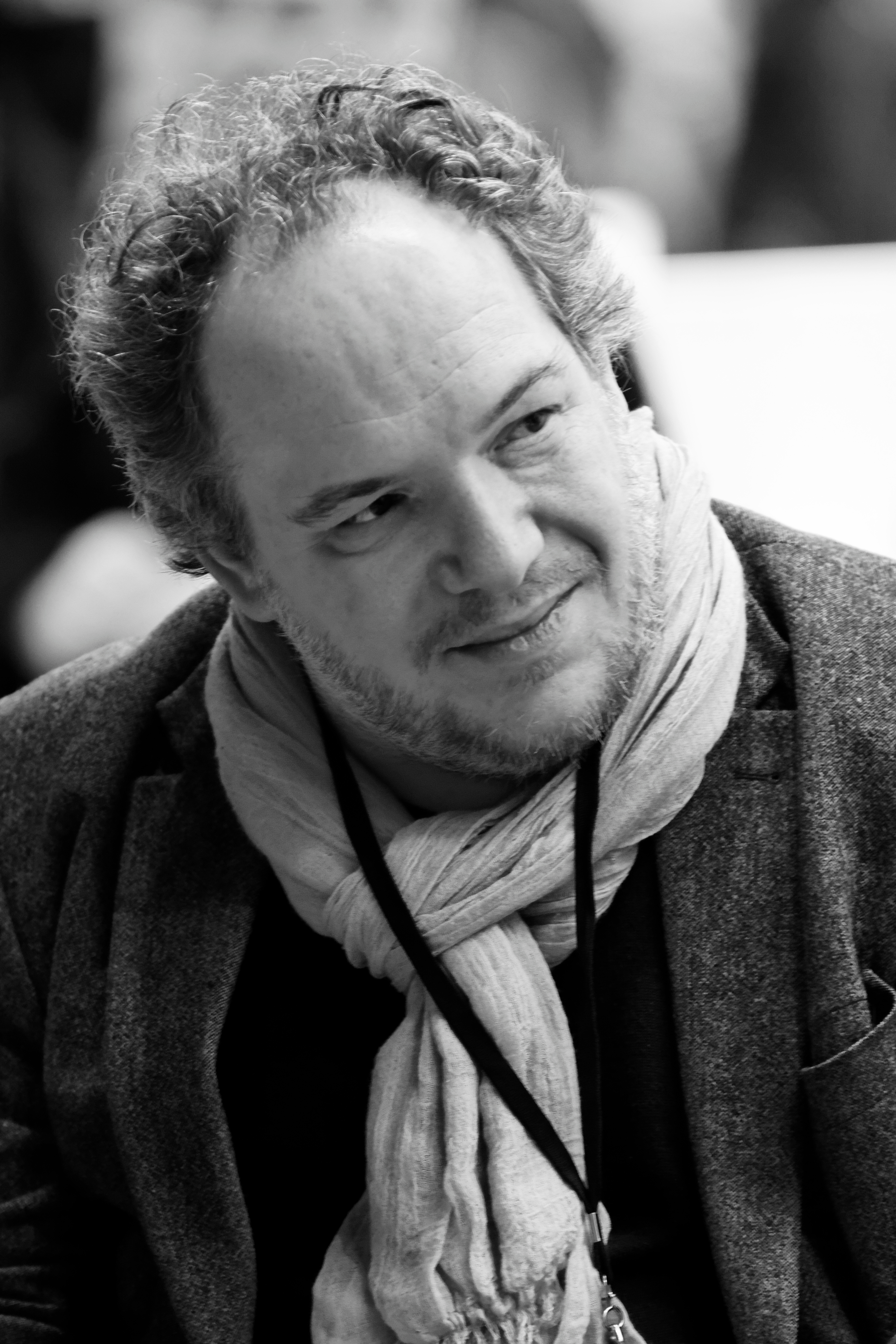
Énard in 2013

This is a list of works published by Mathias Énard.

== Novels ==
- (2003) La Perfection du tir. Arles: Actes Sud. ISBN 9782742744121
  - Translated as Perfecting the Shot by Charlotte Mandell. London: Fitzcarraldo Editions, 2026.
- (2005) Remonter l'Orénoque. Arles: Actes Sud. ISBN 9782330013943
- (2007) Bréviaire des artificiers. Paris: Verticales. ISBN 9782070782789
- (2008) Zone. Arles: Actes Sud. ISBN 9782742777051
  - Translated as Zone by Charlotte Mandell. Rochester: Open Letter Books, 2010. London: Fitzcarraldo Editions, 2014.
- (2010) Parle-leur de batailles, de rois et d'éléphants. Arles: Actes Sud. ISBN 9782742793624
  - Translated as Tell Them of Battles, Kings, and Elephants by Charlotte Mandell. New York: New Directions, 2018.
- (2011) L'alcool et la nostalgie. Paris: Inculte. ISBN 9782916940489
- (2012) Rue des voleurs. Arles: Actes Sud. ISBN 9782330012670
  - Translated as Street of Thieves by Charlotte Mandell. Rochester: Open Letter Books, 2014. London: Fitzcarraldo Editions, 2015.
- (2015) Boussole. Arles: Actes Sud. ISBN 9782330053123
  - Translated as Compass by Charlotte Mandell. New York: New Directions, 2017. London: Fitzcarraldo Editions, 2017.
- (2018) Désir pour désir. Paris: RMN. ISBN 9782711870981
- (2020) Le Banquet annuel de la Confrérie des fossoyeurs. Arles: Actes Sud. ISBN 9782330135508
  - Translated as The Annual Banquet of the Gravediggers' Guild by Frank Wynne. New York: New Directions, 2023. London: Fitzcarraldo Editions, 2024.
- (2023) Déserter. Arles: Actes Sud. ISBN 9782330181611
  - Translated as The Deserters by Charlotte Mandell. New York: New Directions, 2025. London: Fitzcarraldo Editions, 2025.

== Graphic novels ==
- (2013) Tout sera oublié. Illustrated by Pierre Marquès. Arles: Actes Sud. ISBN 9782330018085
- (2018) Prendre refuge. Co-written with and illustrated by Zeina Abirached. Tournai: Casterman. ISBN 9782203148611

== Children's books ==
- (2009) Mangée, mangée !. Illustrated by Pierre Marquès. Arles: Actes Sud. ISBN 9782742785117

== Poetry ==
- (2016) Dernière communication à la société proustienne de Barcelone. Arles: Inculte / Dernière Marge. ISBN 9791095086345

== Non-fiction ==
- (2020) J'y mets ma langue à couper. Paris: Bayard. ISBN 9782227498662
- (2024) Mélancolie des confins – Nord. Arles: Actes Sud. ISBN 9782330196950
- (2026) Hôtel Balkan (Mélancolie des confins II – Est). Arles: Actes Sud. ISBN 9782330224394

== Translations ==
=== From Persian into French ===
- (2004) Épître de la queue, by Mirzâ Habib Esfahâni. Paris: Minimales/Verticales / Gallimard. ISBN 9782843352072

=== From Arabic into French ===
- (2007) Yasser Arafat m'a regardé et m'a souri: journal d'un combattant, by Yussef Bazzi. Paris: Minimales/Verticales / Gallimard. ISBN 9782070785940
