= 1766 Istanbul earthquake =

Earthquake in Turkey

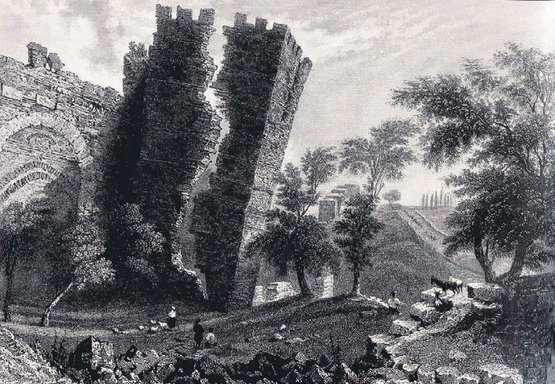
- A tower near the Hücum Kapısı ("The assault gate") belonging to the walls of Constantinople damaged by the earthquake in an engraving by W. H. Bartlett (ante 1838).

- Location within Marmara
- Local date: 22 May 1766
- Local time: 05:10
- Magnitude: 7.1 M_{s}
- Epicenter: 40.8°N 29°E
- Fault: North Anatolian Fault
- Areas affected: Eyalet of Constantinople, Ottoman Empire
- Tsunami: flooded Bosphorus shores, Galata, Mudanya, Princes' Islands
- Casualties: 4,000

The 1766 Istanbul earthquake was a strong earthquake with epicenter in the eastern part of the Sea of Marmara, in the Çınarcık Basin (or near the Princes' Islands, north of the basin) which occurred in the early hours of Thursday morning, 22 May 1766. The earthquake had an estimated magnitude of 7.1 on the surface-wave magnitude scale, and caused effects in a vast area extending from Izmit to Rodosto (now Tekirdağ). In this area, the earthquake was followed by a tsunami which caused significant damage. The earthquake of 1766 was the last major earthquake to rock Istanbul because of a rupture of the North Anatolian Fault in the Marmara region.

== Geology ==
The Sea of Marmara is a pull-apart basin formed at a releasing bend in the North Anatolian Fault (NAF), a right-lateral strike-slip fault. East of the Sea of Marmara the NAF splits into three major branches; while the sinuous southern branch goes inland in a southwesterly direction up to Ayvacık, where it reaches the Aegean Sea near the southern mouth of the Dardanelles, the other two major branches (northern and central) of the NAF, being under the Sea of Marmara about 100 km (62 mi) apart, form the Marmara pull-apart basin, meeting again under the northeast Aegean Sea. This local zone of extension occurs where this transform boundary between the Anatolian Sub-Plate and the Eurasian plate steps northwards to the west of İzmit from the Izmit Fault to the Ganos Fault. Inside the Sea of Marmara there is a smaller pull-apart basin, named the North Marmara fault System (NMFS), which connect the three submarine basins (from west to east): Tekirdağ, Central and Çınarcık) with the Izmit and Ganos Fault (both inland). Near Istanbul the northern side of the NMFS pull-apart coincides with the northern branch of the NAF and is a single main fault segment with a sharp bend. To the west, the fault trends west–east and is pure strike-slip in type. To the east, the fault is northwest–southeast trending and shows evidence of both normal and strike-slip motion.

In 1766, the rupture of the fault happened either under the Princes' Islands or, more probably, under the Çınarcık Basin, since a more central break could not have caused the great tsunami that struck Istanbul and the Gulf of İzmit, although this had been produced by a submarine landslide. The 1766 event has been the last one caused by a rupture of the NAF in the Marmara region; successive large events which caused extensive damage in Istanbul, like the earthquake of 10 July 1894 (with epicenter in the Gulf of İzmit) and that of 9 August 1912 (with epicenter northwest of Marmara Island), have to be considered isolated events caused by the non uniform stress relief during the 18th century earthquake sequence, to which the 1766 event belongs. Since the second last major event with an epicenter in the Istanbul region occurred in 1509, a recurrence interval of 200 to 250 years has been hypothesized.

== Characteristics ==
The earthquake began half an hour after sunrise, at 5:10 a.m. on 22 May 1766, which was the third day of the Kurban Bairam. The first shock, accompanied by a loud roar, lasted two minutes: it was followed by a less intense shock lasting four minutes, and aftershocks continued for eight minutes. In the following weeks there were also several aftershocks, and the duration of the whole sequence amounted to one year. Mathematical models of this event using Coulomb stress transfer are consistent with a fault rupture whose length ranges from 70 to 120 km (43 to 75 mi).

The earthquake was felt as far away as Aydın, Thessaloniki, on Mount Athos, Aytos in eastern Bulgaria and along the west coast of the Black Sea. This earthquake was compared to the catastrophic one in Lisbon, which occurred 11 years earlier.

== Damage ==
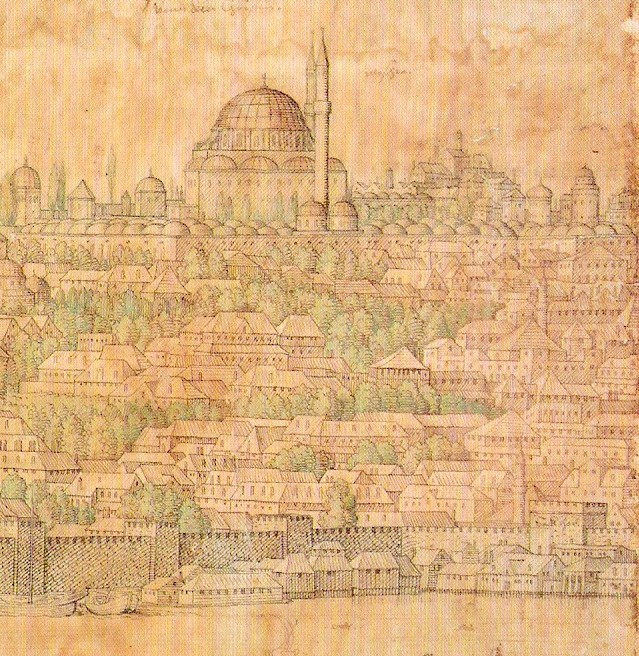
The Fatih mosque and its complex (here in 1559 in a drawing of Melchior Lorck) were destroyed in 1766.

The estimated area of significant damage (greater than the MCS VII grade (Very Strong)) extends from Bursa to Küçükçekmece, but destruction occurred from Tekirdağ and Gelibolu to the west, İzmit to the east and Edirne to the north. The settlements on the Gulf of Mudanya also suffered damage, while Galata and Büyükçekmece were severely damaged. In Constantinople the intensity of the earthquake was estimated between grade VII and VIII-IX; many houses and public buildings collapsed. Furthermore, part of the underground water distribution system was destroyed; the Ayvad dam, on the upper Kâğıthane, was damaged, and in Istanbul the vault of an underground cistern subsided.

In Istanbul, most of the mosques and churches were damaged, as was the Topkapı Palace: the sultan had to live in temporary housing until his home was restored. The panicking populace was unable to go back home, and people sheltered themselves in tents pitched in wide and open spaces. Among the imperial mosques, the dome of that of Bayezid was damaged, while the minaret and the main dome of the mosque of Mihrimah collapsed. The Süleymaniye Mosque was also damaged, while the Fatih Mosque suffered the collapse of the minarets, the main dome and several secondary domes, and 100 students in the Koran school of the Külliye died; so the complex had to be rebuilt. The Kariye Mosque was also seriously damaged, but the Hagia Sophia survived instead almost unharmed.

The castle of Yedikule, Eğrikapı, Edirnekapı and the city walls were also damaged, while there was damage to Galata and Pera and to the Grand Bazaar. At Çatalca and in the surrounding villages all the masonry buildings collapsed. Since the earthquake struck the eastern part of the Sea of Marmara, serious damage was also recorded on the southern shore, from Mudanya to Karamürsel, and the tsunami waves made the ports unusable. The highest level of the tsunami was observed in the Bosphorus region.

=== Casualties ===
The number of deaths was estimated at 4,000, of which 880 were in Istanbul.

== August earthquake ==
In August of the same year, a magnitude 7.4 earthquake struck the Dardanelles region. On that occasion the damage in Istanbul was slight. This earthquake killed more than 5,000 people.

== Sources ==
- Müller-Wiener, Wolfgang (1977). Bildlexikon zur Topographie Istanbuls: Byzantion, Konstantinupolis, Istanbul bis zum Beginn d. 17. Jh (in German). Tübingen, Germany: Wasmuth. ISBN 978-3-8030-1022-3. OCLC 3747838.
