= Jean Cocteau: A Life =

2003 book by Claude Arnaud

- English language book cover for Jean Cocteau: A Life (2016 printed)
- Author: Claude Arnaud
- Original title: Jean Cocteau
- Translator: Lauren Elkin; Charlotte Mandell
- Language: French
- Subject: Jean Cocteau
- Genre: biography
- Publisher: éditions Gallimard
- Publication date: 25 August 2003
- Publication place: France
- English publication date: 27 September 2016
- Pages: 864
- ISBN: 9782070752331

Jean Cocteau: A Life, original title Jean Cocteau, is a biography about the French writer and filmmaker Jean Cocteau. It was written by Claude Arnaud and published by éditions Gallimard on 25 August 2003. Yale University Press published it in English on 27 September 2016.

The book was awarded the 2004 Prix Amic from the Académie Française. The English-language translators, Lauren Elkin and Charlotte Mandell, received the French-American Foundation's translation prize.
