= Tell Them of Battles, Kings, and Elephants =

2010 novel by Mathias Énard

- First edition (French)
- Author: Mathias Énard
- Original title: Parle-leur de batailles, de rois et d'éléphants
- Translator: Charlotte Mandell
- Publisher: Actes Sud
- Publication date: 2010
- English publication date: 2018

Tell Them of Battles, Kings, and Elephants (originally Parle-leur de batailles, de rois et d'éléphants) is a 2010 novel by French writer Mathias Énard, translated into English by Charlotte Mandell. It was awarded the Prix Goncourt des Lycéens that same year. The translation of the novel into English was published in 2018 by New Directions.

== Writing and development ==
=== Writing ===
Énard initially wanted to include the story of Michelangelo traveling to Constantinople as a brief anecdote in his novel Zone. However, he felt it deserved more than the length he could give over to the story in the context of the novel.

=== Translation into English ===
The novel was translated into English by Charlotte Mandell. Mandell had previously translated other works by Énard, including Compass and Zone. Mandell has said the book's brevity was challenging, forcing her to consider her decisions for longer than when translating other works by Énard.

== Synopsis ==
=== Context ===
The novel details a fictional trip taken by Michelangelo in May 1506 to Constantinople at the request of Sultan Bajazet II, who invited him to abandon the work of the tomb of Pope Julius II in order to instead design a bridge on the Golden Horn, an arm of the sea that separates the Constantinople from the district of Pera, on the Bosphorus. In reality, Michelangelo received and considered the invitation during a period of tension between him and Pope Julius, but did not accept. Leonardo da Vinci produced a design for the bridge, but it was not possible to build it given the engineering constraints of the era.

=== Plot summary ===
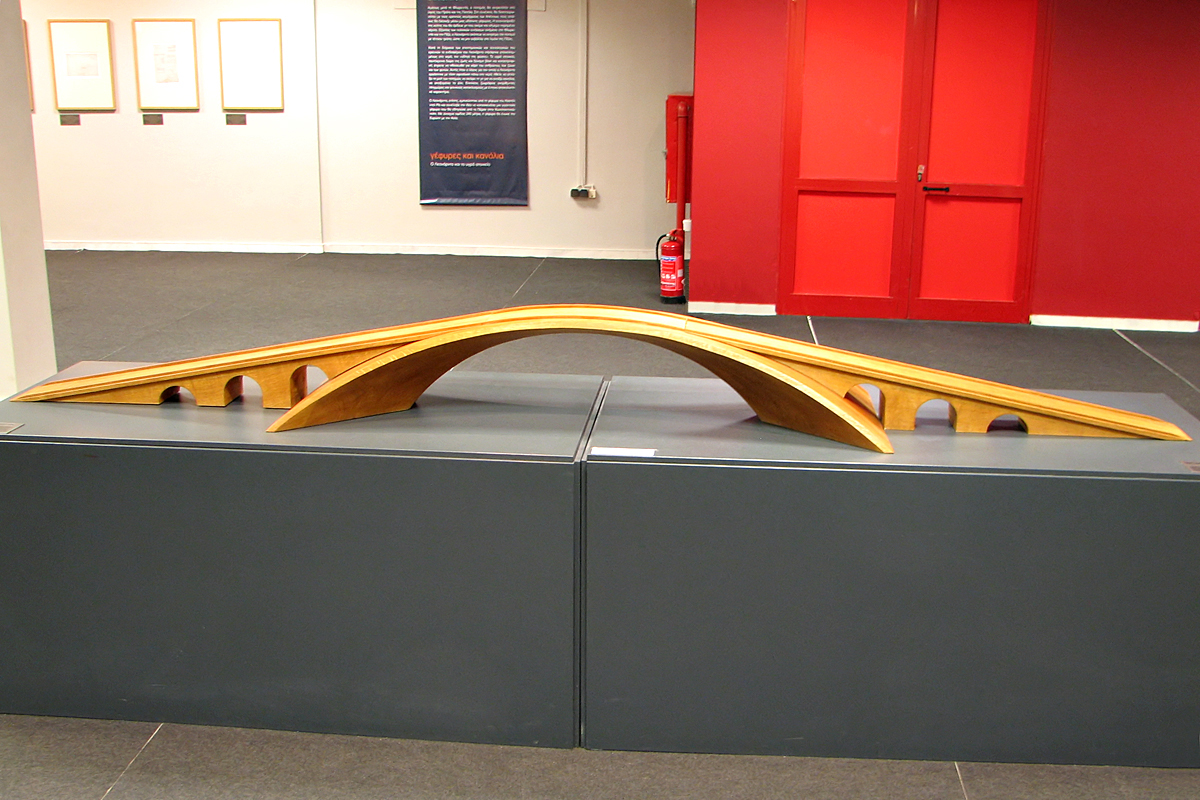
A model of the bridge designed by Leonardo da Vinci

Michelangelo receives a request from Bajazet II to journey to Constantinople to design a bridge in the city. Frustrated by perceived mistreatment at the hands of Pope Julius II and motivated by a sense of rivalry with the older Leonardo da Vinci, who produced a design that was not used, Michelangelo accepts. Michelangelo is at first overwhelmed by the task and ignores the draftsmen and engineers at his disposal, provided by Ali Pasha and the sultan. The artist spends his days on walks around the city, accompanied by Mesihi of Prishtina, a poet patronized by Ali Pasha.

Gradually, the artist develops a deep friendship with Mesihi. Mesihi has a strong romantic attraction to Michelangelo, who senses but does not reciprocate the feelings. Michelangelo in turn has developed an affection for an Andalusian dancer, with whom he spends two nights. Motivated by pressure from the sultan's court, financial concerns, and a desire to return to Italy, Michelangelo finally produces a sketch for the bridge which the sultan accepts. However, he learns that he will not receive payment until a considerable amount of work on the bridge has been completed, enraging him. The sultan does provide the artist the incomes associated with a village as a gift beyond his promised wages, but Michelangelo gives the deed to Mesihi.

After a celebration of the Nativity of Saint John the Baptist, Michelangelo departs for his lodgings, accompanied by the Andalusian dancer. Mesihi trades the deed to the village for knowledge of a plot against Michelangelo's life—members of the Ottoman court have decided to kill him to prevent the construction of a bridge designed by an infidel. The conspirators have compelled the Andalusian to murder him as he sleeps. Before she can, Mesihi kills her; Michelangelo assumes he acted out of jealousy, and the two wound each other while fighting. Michelangelo eventually leaves Constantinople without seeing Mesihi again.

The 1509 Constantinople earthquake later destroys the unfinished bridge. Mesihi takes his own life after losing his patronage. Michelangelo completes a number of works in Italy, including the Sistine Chapel ceiling and St. Peter's Basilica and dies in Rome some sixty years after leaving Constantinople.

== Reception ==
Julie Étienne, for Le Monde, wrote that the novel is "solemn and graceful at the same time [...] even if it happens to graze preciousness, and doesn't always avoid somewhat stiff lyricism and symbolism." Writing for The New Yorker, Julian Lucas praised the quality of the translation by Mandell. Sam Sacks, in a review published by The Wall Street Journal, also praised the translation.
