= Andreas Mand =

German author

- Born: 14 December 1959 (age 66); Duisburg, North Rhine-Westphalia, Germany
- Education: Magister in Media Studies
- Alma mater: University of Osnabrück
- Occupations: Novelist, playwright, short story writer, essayist,
- Writing career
- Language: German
- Period: 1982–present
- Genres: Novels, short stories, essays, rock music (lyrics), plays,
- Subject: Personal life
- Notable works: Child of father (Vaterkind), ISBN 3-7017-1262-X.
- Notable awards: Candide Preis
- Literary movement: contemporary literature

Andreas Mand (born 14 December 1959) is a German contemporary author of novels, short stories and essays and a playwright. He is one of the representatives of the German Popular literature, and in addition a stay-at-home dad, because he wanted to be an active part of his children's lives.

== Education and life ==
Andreas Mand was born in Duisburg, North Rhine-Westphalia, Germany as the son of a parson.
After elementary school he attended the Fichte- Gymnasium Krefeld. Then he studied at the University of Osnabrück and attained the Magister degree in Media Studies. Later he lived for a while in Berlin and Duisburg. Several years he has been working as a stay at home father, and only wrote in his leisure, while his wife works outside of the home. Sometimes, the role of stay-at-home dad was difficult for him, because in Germany, this practice is less common. Mand is working and living in Minden, North Rhine-Westphalia.

== Work ==
=== Novels ===
- 1982 Walks away. A school article (Haut ab. Ein Schulaufatz), Nemo Press, Hamburg, ISBN 3-922513-09-3
- 1984 Internal unrests (Innere Unruhen), Kellner-Verlag, Hamburg, ISBN 3-922035-27-2.
- 1990 Grovers invention (Grovers Erfindung), List-Taschenbuchverlag, Munich, ISBN 3-612-65032-7.
- 1992 The dream of the Konditor (Der Traum des Konditors), Unabhängige Verlagsbuchhandlung, Berlin, ISBN 3-86172-029-9.
- 1993 Grover at the lake (Grover am See), 2. Aufl. MaroVerlag, Augsburg, ISBN 3-87512-213-5.
- 1994 Peng, Edition Solitude, Stuttgart, ISBN 3-929085-13-5.
- 1994 The red ship, (Das rote Schiff), MaroVerlag, Augsburg, ISBN 3-87512-225-9.
- 1996 Small Town heroes, (Kleinstadthelden), Ammann Verlag, Zurich, ISBN 3-250-10292-X.
- 1998 Cataloguing of childhood memories: The great Groverbook, (Das Große Grover Buch), Ammann Verlag, Zurich, ISBN 3-250-60016-4.
- 2001 Child of father (Vaterkind), Residenz-Verlag, Salzburg, ISBN 3-7017-1262-X.
- 2004 Bad night-narrative (Schlechtenachtgeschichte), MaroVerlag, Augsburg, ISBN 3-87512-272-0.
- 2006 Paul and the Beatmashine (Paul und die Beatmaschine), MaroVerlag, Augsburg, ISBN 978-3-87512-278-7.
- 2015 The second Garden (Der zweite Garten), MaroVerlag, Augsburg, ISBN 978-3-87512-471-2.

=== Short stories and essays ===
- 2009 Fairport Convention in: Rock Stories: Fifty short stories about music and their significance, Verlag Langen Müller, ISBN 978-3-7844-3195-6
- 2011 Essay in: Rumba with the Rum drunkards (Rumba mit den Rumsäufern), Frank Schäfer, Oktoberverlag Münster, ISBN 978-3-941895-14-0
- 2011 Short stories in: Hyde Park-Memories. A music club of Osnabrück and the history (stories) (Hyde Park-Memories. Ein Osnabrücker Musikclub und seine Geschichte(n)), Harald Keller/Reiner Wolf, Oktoberverlag Münster, ISBN 978-3-941895-16-4

=== Plays ===
- 2010 The Grover game (Das Grover Spiel) and Practice room eternity (Proberaum Ewigkeit), MaroVerlag, Augsburg, ISBN 978-3-87512-289-3.

=== Compact Disc ===
- Some time from 1984 to 1989 he was singer-songwriter of his own band of musicians that plays popular music and
  in 2007 he published a Demo Compact Disc Popmusik: A little file (Eine kleine Feile), which today can probably be attributed to the musical movement Hamburger Schule.
- Siebenkäs songs (Siebenkäs-Lieder), based on the novel Siebenkäs, by Jean Paul (Demo, 2 tapes), 1998

== Awards ==
- 1992 Literary award of Lower Rhine
- 1996 Nominated for the Ingeborg Bachmann Prize
- 2000 Candide Preis
