= Çınarcık Basin =

The Çınarcık Basin is a submarine tectonic basin located in the Sea of Marmara, in Turkey.

== Geography ==
The Çınarcık basin gets its name from Çınarcık, a town and district of the Yalova Province in the Marmara region of Turkey. It is the easternmost of the three basins which run in direction EW in the sea, the other two being (from E to W) the central basin and the Tekirdağ basin. Its maximum depth amounts to 1,276 m.

== Geology ==
The Çınarcık Basin is a transtensional basin which runs along the Princes' Islands segment of the northern branch of the North Anatolian Fault (NAF). However, in correspondence with the basin there is no evidence of a single strike-slip Fault, neither is visible a cross-basin fault or a pure strike-slip fault in correspondence of the northern margin; along the southern and northern edges seismic imaging shows many deep-penetrating faults. The basin hosted the nucleation points of many among the strongest earthquakes of the region, like those of 1509 and of 1766, and is expected to host the epicenter of the next large earthquake that will hit Istanbul.
