= Charlotte Mandell =

Literary translator from French

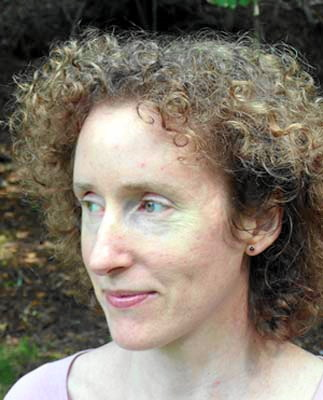
Charlotte Mandell, photo by Robert Kelly.

Charlotte Mandell (born 1968) is an American literary translator. She has translated many works of poetry, fiction and philosophy from French to English, including work by Honoré de Balzac, Gustave Flaubert, Jules Verne, Guy de Maupassant, Marcel Proust, Maurice Blanchot, Antoine de Baecque, Abdelwahab Meddeb, Bernard-Henri Lévy, Jean-Luc Nancy, Mathias Énard and Jonathan Littell.

== Life ==
Charlotte Mandell was born in Hartford, Connecticut in 1968, the child of two academics. She was educated at Boston Latin School, Université de Paris III, and Bard College, where she studied French literature and film theory. She is married to the poet Robert Kelly.

== Awards and honours ==
Mandell's translations have twice been recognised by the International Booker Prize. In 2017, her translation of Mathias Énard's Compass (Boussole) was shortlisted for the prize. In 2026, her translation of Mathias Énard's The Deserters (Déserter) was longlisted. Also in 2026, The Deserters received the French-American Foundation Translation Prize in Fiction.

In 2021 she received a Chevalier de l’Ordre des Arts et des Lettres from the French government. In 2024 she received the Thornton Wilder Translation Prize from the American Academy of Arts and Letters.

In addition, she was awarded the Aldo and Jeanne Scaglione Prize for a Translation of a Scholarly Study of Literature for 2001-2002 by the Modern Language Association for her translation of Maurice Blanchot’s Faux Pas. She received a 2010 National Endowment for the Arts Literature Fellowship for her translation of Mathias Énard's Zone. Her translation with Lauren Elkin of Jean Cocteau by Claude Arnaud received a 2017 French-American Foundation Translation Prize. Her translation of Mathias Énard's Compass won a 2018 ALTA National Translation Award in Prose.

== Translations ==
=== Claude Arnaud ===
- Jean Cocteau: A Life. Co-translated with Lauren Elkin. Yale University Press, 2016.

=== Honoré de Balzac ===
- The Girl with the Golden Eyes. Melville House, 2008.

=== Pierre Bayard ===
- Sherlock Holmes Was Wrong: Reopening the Case of the Hound of the Baskervilles. Bloomsbury, 2008.

=== Pierre Birnbaum ===
- Geography of Hope. Stanford University Press, 2008.

=== François Bizot ===
- Facing the Torturer. Knopf, 2012.

=== Maurice Blanchot ===
- The Work of Fire. Stanford University Press, 1995.
- Faux Pas. Stanford University Press, 2001.
- The Book to Come. Stanford University Press, 2003.
- A Voice from Elsewhere. State University of New York Press, 2007.

=== André Breton and Philippe Soupault ===
- The Magnetic Fields. New York Review Books, 2020.

=== Roland Buti ===
- The Year of the Drought. Old Street Publishing, 2017.

=== Louis-Ferdinand Céline ===
- War. New Directions, 2024.

=== The Dalai Lama ===
- My Spiritual Journey. HarperOne, 2010.

=== Jean Daniel ===
- The Jewish Prison. Melville House, 2005.

=== Antoine de Baecque ===
- The Body Politic: Corporeal Metaphor in Revolutionary France, 1770-1800. Stanford University Press, 1997.
- Glory and Terror: Seven Deaths under the French Revolution. Routledge, 2001.

=== Benoît Duteurtre ===
- The Little Girl and the Cigarette. Melville House, 2007.

=== Mathias Énard ===
- Zone. Open Letter Books, 2010.
- Street of Thieves. Open Letter, 2014.
- Compass. New York: New Directions, 2017.
- Tell Them of Battles, Kings, and Elephants. New Directions, 2018.
- The Deserters. New Directions, 2025.

=== Gustave Flaubert ===
- A Simple Heart. Melville House, 2004.

=== Jean Genet ===
- Fragments of the Artwork. Stanford University Press, 2003.
- The Criminal Child: Selected Essays. New York Review Books, 2020.

=== Bernard-Henri Lévy ===
- War, Evil, and the End of History. Melville House, 2004.
- American Vertigo: Traveling America in the Footsteps of Tocqueville. Random House, 2006.

=== Justine Lévy ===
- Nothing Serious. Melville House, 2005.

=== Jonathan Littell ===
- The Kindly Ones. HarperCollins, 2009.
- The Invisible Enemy. Amazon Kindle Singles series, January 2011.
- The Fata Morgana Books. Two Lines Press, 2013.
- Syrian Notebooks: Inside the Homs Uprising. Verso, 2015.
- An Inconvenient Place. Fitzcarraldo, 2024.

=== Guy de Maupassant ===
- The Horla. Melville House, 2005.

=== Abdelwahab Meddeb ===
- The Malady of Islam. Co-translated (as Ann Reid) with Pierre Joris. Basic Books, 2003.
- Tombeau of Ibn Arabi and White Traverses, with an afterword by Jean-Luc Nancy. Fordham University Press, 2009.

=== Jean-Luc Nancy ===
- Listening. Fordham University Press, 2007.
- The Fall of Sleep. Fordham University Press, 2009.
- After Fukushima: The Equivalence of Catastrophes. Fordham University Press, 2014.
- Coming. Fordham University Press, 2016.

=== Jean Paulhan ===
- On Poetry and Politics (co-translated with Jennifer Bajorek and Eric Trudel). University of Illinois Press, 2008.

=== Marcel Proust ===
- The Lemoine Affair. Melville House, 2008.
- The Mysterious Correspondent, Simon & Schuster, 2021.
- In the Shadow of Girls in Blossom, Oxford World Classics, 2025.

=== Jacques Rancière ===
- The Flesh of Words. Stanford University Press, 2004.

=== Peter Szendy ===
- Listen: A History of Our Ears. Fordham University Press, 2008.

=== Sima Vaisman ===
- A Jewish Doctor in Auschwitz. Melville House, 2005.

=== Paul Valéry ===
- Monsieur Teste. New York Review Books, 2024.

=== Jules Verne ===
- The Castle in Transylvania. Melville House, 2010.
