= Candide Preis =

Coordinates: 52°18′52″N 13°19′06″E

- Awarded for: contemporary authors
- Location: originally in Minden
- Country: Germany, France
- Presented by: Literarischer Verein Minden, Foundation Genshagen; Villa Gillet (Lyon), Minister of Culture (France)
- First award: 1995
- Final award: 2011
- Website: Official website of the Literary Association Minden

Candide Preis (originally called Stadtschreiber Stipendium, later Candide Preis) is the only German-French literary award, named for its French satire Candide (first published in 1759 by Voltaire).

From 1995 to 2011 it was awarded annually by the Foundation Genshagen, the Literary Association Minden, the Villa Gillet (Lyon) and the Minister of Culture (France) to French and German contemporary authors.

== List of laureates ==
- 1995: Franz Hodjak
- 1996: Gert Loschütz
- 1997: Katja Lange-Müller
- 1998: Hansjörg Schertenleib
- 1999: Christine Scherrmann
- 2000: Andreas Mand
- 2001: Harald Gröhler
- 2002: Burkhard Spinnen
- 2003: Roland Koch (author)
- 2004: Andreas Maier
- 2005: Daniel Kehlmann
- 2006: Karl-Heinz Ott
- 2007: André Kubiczek
- 2008: Martin Kluger and Mathias Énard
- 2009: Volker Braun and Olivia Rosenthal
- 2010: Jan Faktor
- 2011: Peter Handke
