= Robert Kelly (poet) =

American poet (born 1935)

- Robert Kelly in 2012
- Born: September 24, 1935 (age 91); Brooklyn, New York, U.S.
- Education: Columbia University; University at Buffalo; The City College of New York
- Occupation: Poet
- Spouse: Charlotte Mandell
- Writing career
- Genre: Poetry

Robert Kelly (born September 24, 1935) is an American poet associated with the deep image group. He was named the first Dutchess County poet laureate 2016-2017.

== Early life and education ==
Kelly was born in 1935 in Brooklyn, New York, to Samuel Jason and Margaret Rose Kelly née Kane. He studied at the City College of the City University of New York, graduating with a degree in 1955. He then spent three years at Columbia University.

== Teaching career ==
Kelly has worked as a translator and teacher, most notably at Bard College, where he has worked since 1961. Kelly's other teaching positions have included Wagner College (1960–61), the University at Buffalo (1964), and the Tufts University Visiting Professor of Modern Poetry (1966–67). In addition, he has served as Poet in Residence at the California Institute of Technology (1971–72), Yale University (Calhoun College), University of Kansas, Dickinson College, and the University of Southern California.

Kelly is the Asher B. Edelman Professor of Literature at Bard College (1986–) and Co-Director of The Program in Written Arts. He is a Founding Member of the Milton Avery Graduate School of the Arts.

== Writing career ==
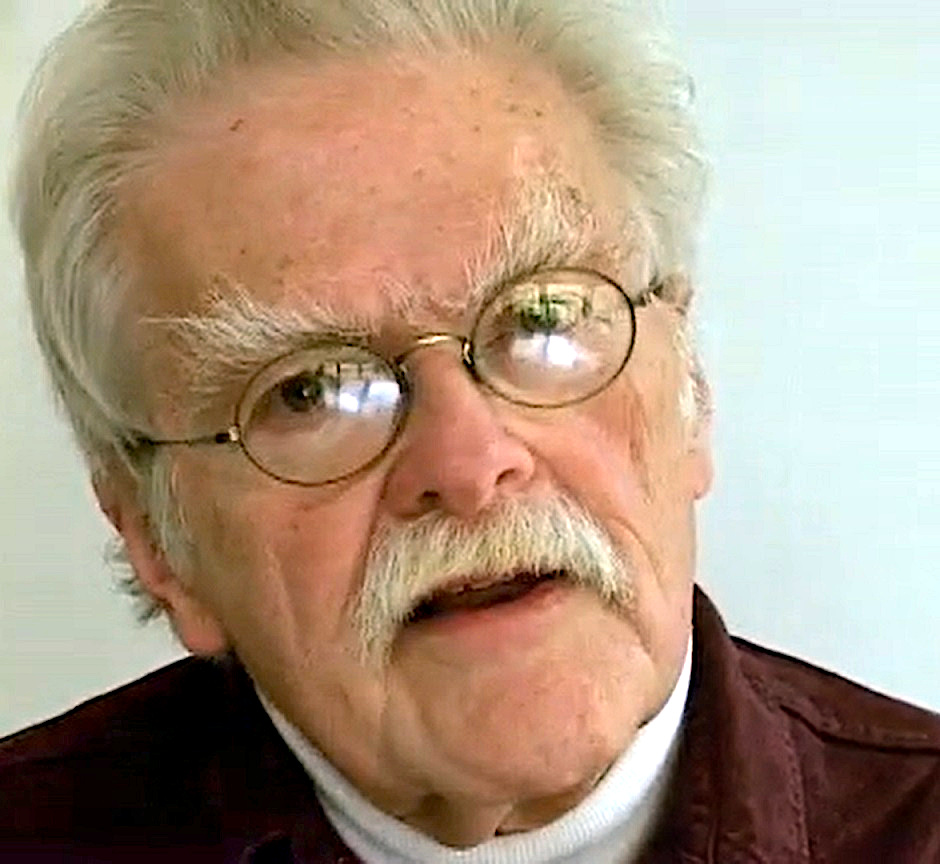
Kelly in Speaking Portraits, c.2003

Kelly, on his influences: ″I want to say the names of the great teachers from whom I learned what I could, and still am learning. Coleridge. Baudelaire. Pound. Apollinaire. Virgil. Aeschylus. Dante. Chaucer. Shakespeare. Dryden. Lorca. Rilke. Hölderlin. Stevens. Stein. Duncan. Olson. Williams. Blackburn. I mention only the dead, the dead are always different, and always changing. I mention them more or less in the order of when they came along in my life to teach me.″

Kelly has published more than fifty books of poetry and prose, including Red Actions: Selected Poems 1960-1993 (1995) and a collection of short fictions, A Transparent Tree (1985). Many were published by the Black Sparrow Press. He also edited the anthology A Controversy of Poets (1965). Kelly was of great help to the Hungryalist group of poets of India during the trial of Malay Roy Choudhury, with whom he had correspondence, now archived at Kolkata.

Kelly received the Los Angeles Times First Annual Book Award (1980) for Kill the Messenger Who Brings Bad News and the American Book Award, Before Columbus Foundation (1991) for In Time. He serves on the contributing editorial board of the literary journal Conjunctions, as well as Poetry International. He is married to the translator Charlotte Mandell.

=== Books of poetry ===
- Armed Descent, New York: Hawk's Well Press, 1961.
- Her Body Against Time, Mexico City: Ediciones El Corno Emplumado, 1963.
- Round Dances, New York: Trobar Press, 1964.
- Enstasy, Annandale: Matter, 1964.
- Lunes/Sightings, with Jerome Rothenberg, New York: Hawk's Well Press, 1964.
- Words in Service, New Haven: Robert Lamberton, 1966.
- Weeks, Mexico City: Ediciones El Corno Emplumado, 1966.
- Song XXIV, Cambridge: Pym-Randall Press, 1966.
- Devotions, Annandale: Salitter, 1967.
- Twenty Poems, Annandale: Matter Books, 1967.
- Axon Dendron Tree, Annandale: Salitter, 1967.
- Crooked Bridge Love Society, Annandale: Salitter, 1967.
- A Joining: A Sequence for H:D:, Los Angeles:Black Sparrow Press, 1967.
- Alpha, Gambier, Ohio: The Pot Hanger Press, 1967.
- Finding the Measure, Los Angeles: Black Sparrow Press, 1968.
- Sonnets, Los Angeles: Black Sparrow Press, 1968.
- Songs I-XXX, Cambridge: Pym-Randall Press, 1968.
- The Common Shore, (Books 1 - 5) Los Angeles: Black Sparrow Press, 1969.
- A California Journal, London: Big Venus Books, 1969.
- Kali Yuga, London: Jonathan Cape, 1970. A Cape Goliard Book.
- Flesh Dream Book, Los Angeles: Black Sparrow Press, 1971.
- In Time, West Newbury: Frontier Press, 1971
- Cities. West Newbury: Frontier Press, 1972.
- Ralegh, Los Angeles: Black Sparrow Press, 1972.
- The Pastorals, Los Angeles: Black Sparrow Press, 1972.
- Reading Her Notes, Uniondale: privately printed at the Salisbury Press, 1972.
- The Tears of Edmund Burke, Annandale, privately printed, 1973.
- The Mill of Particulars, Los Angeles: Black Sparrow Press, 1973.
- The Loom, Los Angeles: Black Sparrow Press, 1975.
- Sixteen Odes, Los Angeles: Black Sparrow Press, 1976.
- The Lady Of, Los Angeles: Black Sparrow Press, 1977.
- The Convections, Santa Barbara: Black Sparrow Press, 1977.
- The Book of Persephone, New Paltz: Treacle Press, 1978.
- Kill the Messenger, Santa Barbara: Black Sparrow Press, 1979.
- The Cruise of the Pnyx, Barrytown: Station Hill Press, 1979.
- Sentence, Barrytown: Station Hill Press, 1980.
- Spiritual Exercises, Santa Barbara: Black Sparrow Press, 1981.
- The Alchemist to Mercury: an alternate opus, Uncollected Poems 1960–1980, edited by Jed Rasula, Berkeley: North Atlantic Books, 1981.
- Mulberry Women, with drypoints by Matt Phillips, Berkeley: Hiersoux, Powers, Thomas, 1982.
- Under Words, Santa Barbara: Black Sparrow Press, 1983.
- Thor's Thrush, Oakland: The Coincidence Press, 1984.
- Not this Island Music, Santa Rosa: Black Sparrow Press, 1987.
- The Flowers of Unceasing Coincidence, Barrytown: Station Hill Press, 1988.
- Oahu, Rhinebeck: St Lazaire Press, 1988.
- Ariadne, Rhinebeck: St Lazaire Press, 1991.
- Manifesto for the Next New York School, Buffalo: Leave Press, 1991.
- A Strange Market, (Poems 1985-1988), Santa Rosa: Black Sparrow Press, 1992.
- Mont Blanc, a long poem inscribed within Shelleys, Ann Arbor, Otherwind Press, 1994.
- Red Actions: Selected Poems 1960-1993, Santa Rosa, Black Sparrow Press, 1995.
- The Time of Voice, Poems 1994-1996. Santa Rosa: Black Sparrow Press. 1998. ISBN 978-1-57423-079-6.
- Runes, Ann Arbor, Otherwind Press, 1999.
- The Garden of Distances, with Brigitte Mahlknecht, Vienna / Lana, Editions Procura, 1999.
- Unquell the Dawn Now : a collaboration with Friedrich Holderlin Schuldt, McPherson, 1999.
- Lapis. Black Sparrow Press. 2005. ISBN 978-1-57423-186-1.
- Shame = Scham : a collaboration with Birgit Kempker, McPherson, 2005.
- Samphire, Backwoods Broadsides Chaplet Series Nº 97, 2006.
- Threads, First Intensity Press, 2006.
- May Day, Parsifal Editions, 2006.
- SAINTE–TERRE or The White Stone, Woodstock: Shivastan Publishing, 2006.
- Fire Exit, Boston: Black Widow Press, 2009.
- Uncertainties, Barrytown: Station Hill Press, 2011.
- Winter Music, with Susan Quasha, Barrytown: 'T'Space with Station Hill Press, 2014.
- The Color Mill, with Nathlie Provosty, New York: Spuyten Duyvil, 2014.
- The Language of Eden, Metambesen, 2014.
- Answer the Light, with Sherry Williams, Metambesen, 2014.
- Claws, with Barbara Leon, Metambesen, 2014.
- A Break in the Weather, Metambesen, 2014.
- Seven Fairy Tales, Metambesen, 2015
- Steps, Metambesen, 2015
- I Tarocchi Nuovi, Metambesen, 2015
- An Advent Calendar, Hudson: The Doris/Books, 2015
- Opening the Seals, New York: Autonomedia, 2016 ISBN 9781570272653
- Heart Thread, Hudson: Lunar Chandelier Collective, 2016 ISBN 978-0-9973715-0-5
- Certainties (The Maxims of Martin Traubenritter), Metambesen, 2016
- The Hexagon, Boston: Black Widow Press, 2016 ISBN 978-0-9971725-1-5
- The Secret Name of Now, New York Rio de Janeiro Paris: Dr. Cicero, 2016 ISBN 9780692742006
- Concealed in Brightness, with Charlotte Mandell, Metambesen, 2018
- The Caprices, Hudson: Lunar Chandelier Collective, 2018 ISBN 978-0-9997831-5-3
- Calls, Hudson: Lunar Chandelier Collective, 2018 ISBN 978-0-9997831-0-8
- The Cloudherding Book, with Charlotte Mandell, Metambesen, 2019
- Ten New Fairy Tales, Illustrated by Emma Polyakov, Kingston: McPherson & Co., 2019 ISBN 9781620540374
- Seaspel, Hudson: Lunar Chandelier Collective, 2019 ISBN 978-0-9997831-9-1
- Reasons to Resist, Hudson: Lunar Chandelier Collective, 2020 ISBN 978-0-9986636-5-4
- The Reader, Metambesen, 2020
- The Questing, Metambesen, 2020
- Doors / Türen, Selected and Translated into German by Urs Engeler, Metambesen, 2020
- Leaflight, with Charlotte Mandell, Metambesen, 2020
- Strings, Metambesen, 2021
- The Cup, Kingston: McPherson & Co., 2021 ISBN 978-1-62054-045-9
- Linden Word, New York: Black Square Editions, 2023 ISBN 978-0-999702-88-8
- Symphonies, Asheville: Wet Cement, 2025 ISBN 979-8-9918692-5-6
- Listening Through, New York: Contra Mundum, 2025 ISBN 978-1-940625-79-9
- Metalogues, Barrytown: Station Hill, 2026 ISBN 978-1-58177-250-0

=== Prose ===
- The Scorpions, Garden City: Doubleday, 1967.
- A Transparent Tree, Kingston: McPherson & Company, 1985.
- The Scorpions (new edition), Barrytown: Station Hill Press, 1985.
- Doctor of Silence, Kingston: McPherson & Company, 1988.
- Cat Scratch Fever, McPherson & Company, 1990.
- Queen of Terrors, McPherson & Company, 1994.
- The Book from the Sky, Berkeley: North Atlantic Books, 2008.
- The Logic of the World, McPherson & Company, 2010.
- The Work of the Heart, New York Rio de Janeiro Paris: Dr. Cicero, 2020 ISBN 9781945766190

=== Plays ===
- Oedipus After Colonus, and other plays, New York: Dr. Cicero Books, 2014.

The play Oedipus After Colonus takes as its point of departure Oedipus at Colonus, by Sophocles: it was first performed in 2010 under the direction of Crichton Atkinson at the HERE Arts Center in New York City as a part of HEREstay Festival - September, 2010.

=== Anthologies ===
- A Controversy of Poets: An Anthology of Contemporary Poetry, Edited with Paris Leary, Garden City: Doubleday, 1965.
- A Voice Full of Cities: The Collected Essays of Robert Kelly, Edited by Pierre Joris & Peter Cockelbergh, New York: Contra Mundum Press, 2014.
- A City Full of Voices: Essays on the Work of Robert Kelly, Edited by Pierre Joris with Peter Cockelbergh & Joel Newberger, New York: Contra Mundum Press, 2020.

=== Magazine affiliations ===
- Chelsea Review (now Chelsea), co-founder, ed. 1957–1960.
- Trobar (with George Economou), co-editor 1960–1965.
- Matter, Editor, 1963– . Online edition, 2003–

Matter, Online edition.

- Caterpillar, contributing editor 1968–1972.
- Los, guest editor New Series No. 1, 1975.
- Alcheringa:ethnopoetics, contributing editor, 1977–1980.
- Sulfur, Contributing editor 1980-1981
- Conjunctions, contributing editor 1990–.
- Poetry International, contributing editor 1996–.

=== Metambesen ===
Kelly and Charlotte Mandell co-founded Metambesen.org(exploring the "flanges of words") in 2014. The homepage reads: "As citizens in the commonwealth of language, we are anxious to make new work freely and easily available, using the swift herald of the internet to bring readers chapbooks and other texts they can read and download without cost." To date they have published over forty texts.

=== Translations into other languages ===
- Poems and stories have been translated into Spanish, Portuguese, French, Italian, German and Serbian.
- Su cuerpo contra el tiempo, Mexico City, Ediciones El Corno Emplumado, 1963. Translated by Margaret Randall and Sergio Mondaron.
- A collection of short stories has been announced by Christian Bourgois in Paris.
- Il Maestro di Silenzio, translated by Anna Pensante, Milan, Editore Tranchida, 1993.
- Translations of other fiction forthcoming in Italian and German. Work appears in anthologies of modern American poetry that have been published in Mexico, Spain, France, Italy, Brazil and Germany.
- Il albero transparente, translated by Anna Pensante, Milan, Editore Tranchida, 1994.
- Geschichten aus Russisch, translated by Schuldt, Berlin, Edition Plasma, 1995.
- Schlaflose Schönheit, translated by Schuldt, Salzburg, Residenz Verlag, 1996.
- Scham/Shame (a collaboration with Brigit Kempker). Basel, Urs Engeler Editor, 2004.
- Die Skorpione, translated by Lorenz Oehler, Holderbank, roughboks, 2011.
- Die Sprache von Eden, translated by Urs Engeler, Holderbank, roughboks, 2016.
- Postcards from the Underworld (საფოსტო ბარათები ქვესკნელიდან / Saposto baratebi qvesknelidan), translated by Irakli Qolbaia, Published by Dato Barbakadze, Tbilisi, Georgia, 2019.
- Gewissheiten. Die Maximen des Martin Traubenritter, translated by Urs Engeler, Schupfart, Das Versteck, 2020.
- Doors / Türen, translated by Urs Engeler, Annandale-on-Hudson, Metambesen, 2020.
- La Coppa, translated by Maura Del Serra, Pistoia, Editrice Petite Plaisance, 2023.

== Sources ==
- Plummer, John P. (2004), The Many Paths of the Independent Sacramental Movement, Berkeley CA: The Apocryphile Press, ISBN 0-9771461-2-X
