= 1894 Istanbul earthquake =

Earthquake in Turkey

- Location within Marmara
- UTC time: 1894-07-10
- Local date: 10 July 1894
- Magnitude: 7.0 M_{s}
- Epicenter: 40.73°N 29.25°E
- Areas affected: Ottoman Empire
- Max. intensity: MMI IX (Violent)
- Casualties: At least 1,349

The 1894 Istanbul earthquake occurred in the Çınarcık Basin or Gulf of Izmit in the Sea of Marmara on 10 July at 12:24pm. The earthquake had an estimated M_{s} magnitude of 7.0. At least an estimated 1,349 people were killed in towns around the Gulf of Izmit such as Yalova, Sapanca and Adapazarı, and in Ottoman Constantinople (present day Istanbul). The main shock caused a tsunami 1.5 metres (4.9 ft) high.

== Background ==
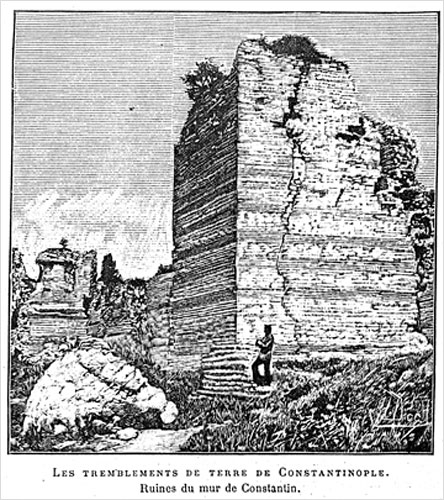
An 1894 xylograph showing damage to the Wall of Constantine. Printed originally in Science Illustré, 25 August 1894, p. 193.

The Sea of Marmara is a pull-apart basin formed at a releasing bend in the North Anatolian Fault, a right-lateral strike-slip fault. This local zone of extension occurs where this transform boundary between the Anatolian Plate and the Eurasian plate steps northwards to the west of Izmit from the Izmit Fault to the Ganos Fault. The pattern of faults within the Sea of Marmara basin is complex but near Istanbul there is a single main fault segment with a sharp bend. To the west, the fault trends west–east and is pure strike-slip in type. To the east, the fault is NW–SE trending and show evidence of both normal and strike-slip motion. Movement on the Gulf of Izmit section of the fault, which bounds the Çınarcık Basin, is the most likely cause of the 1894 event. Other possible causes are movement on the Princes' Islands segment of the fault (to the west of the Gulf of Izmit), and movement on a normal fault in the Çinarcik basin, separate from the North Anatolian Fault.

== Damage ==
The earthquake is estimated to have generated shaking with a modified Mercalli intensity of 9 at Sapanca, 8.5 at Yalova, and 8 at Adapazarı, Büyükçekmece, Gebze, Kartal, Küçükçekmece and on the Princes' Islands. The quake killed 990 people in the area around Yalova and Sapanca, 83 in Adapazarı and 276 in Istanbul.

=== Response ===
Numerous civil society organisations in Belgrade, capital of the nascent Kingdom of Serbia, organized benefit events to collect aid for victims of the catastrophe.

== See also ==
- List of earthquakes in Turkey
- List of historical earthquakes
