= Nathlie Provosty =

American visual artist

Nathlie Provosty (born 1981 in Cincinnati, Ohio), is an American visual artist living in Brooklyn, New York, working in painting, drawing, and artist’s books. She has gained notoriety for subtle, abstract oil paintings that explore the subjects of paradox, misperception, and multi-dimensional space through the usage of trompe-l’oeil edges, oily and matte surfaces, and semi-anthropomorphic letter-like shapes that allude to wave-forms and deconstructed language.

== Education ==
In 2004 Provosty received a BFA from the Maryland Institute College of Art, followed by a Fulbright research Fellowship to India for painting in 2004-2005, and an MFA from the University of Pennsylvania in 2007.

== Career ==
Provosty has exhibited at Bortolami Gallery in NYC, where she staged a solo exhibition in late 2025. She is represented by A Palazzo Gallery in Italy, where she has had solo exhibitions in 2023, 2020-2021, and 2017. In 2023 she presented her first large-scaled museum exhibition at the ICA Milano. Entitled “What a fool ever to have been tricked into seriousness,” a lyric from the poet William Carlos Williams, the large and monumentally scaled paintings displayed an extreme gravity of purpose combined with subtle painterly witticisms that highlighted misperceptions around “truth” and “reality.”

In Artforum, Yuki Higashino likened Provosty’s work to the ungaikyō, a demonic folkloric Japanese mirror that bewitches with its reflection, dazzling deceptively and/or revealing deeper truths. Higashino states, “there is something both exhilarating and unnerving about how viewers’ movements can transform these paintings so drastically […] as if to underscore this art’s affinity with the enigmatic and its distance from any pure formalism.” Roberta Smith in the New York Times wrote, “[Provosty] effectively complicates the perceptual mysteries of Ad Reinhardt’s Black Paintings with her own sense of scale, atmosphere and material punch. This is no mean feat.”

In 2013, Provosty created the CD and Vinly artwork for the album titled Aheym performed by the Kronos Quartet. The music is composed by the musician Bryce Dessner a member of the musical group The National. In 2014, she collaborated with the poet Robert Kelly. Together, with his poetry and her ink wash images, they produced the book "The Color Mill". In 2020, together with poet Anne Waldman, they published the fanfold collaboration book titled "All rainbows in a brainstem, that we be so contained".

Provosty was the recipient of the Rosenthal Family Foundation Award for Painting in 2012 awarded by The American Academy of Arts and Letters.

In 2012, Provosty had her first one-person exhibition at "1:1", an experimental artist-run gallery in New York. Her first exhibition in a commercial gallery was held at Nathalie Karg Gallery in New York in 2016. Her work is in the collection of the San Francisco Museum of Modern Art the Albright-Knox Art Gallery, and MoMA.

== Painting style ==
Provosty is well-known for her oil paintings on linen and ink washes on paper. By using monochromatic shades of color, she often creates schemes that at first appear geometrically simple but contain implied depths of field, floating elements and nuanced variations of major form elements. She often applies colors to abstract figures with gloss surfaces "floating" in a field of more subtle space and forms with matte finishes. This motif creates variable experiences revealed by angle of view. The changing views reveal the works’ layers.

Provosty also utilizes various media in her works. In the 2016 exhibition at Nathalie Karg Gallery in New York, Provosty created an expanded multi-sensory experience by manipulating colors at the far reach of the spectrum and the surfaces that vibrate and disappear.

== Exhibitions ==
Provosty's paintings have been exhibited extensively at public institutions in North America and Europe, including at the San Francisco Museum of Fine Arts, the ICA Milano, the Norton Museum of Art in Palm Springs, the Santa Barbara Museum of Fine Arts, the Colby Museum of Art, the Farnsworth Museum, and the Portland Museum of Art.[2] Notable commercial gallery showings include at Gagosian in London, for an exhibition entitled “To Bend the Ear of the Outer World,” curated by Gary Garrels.

=== Solo exhibitions ===
- 2025, Bortolami Gallery, New York
- 2023, Fondazione IAC Milano, curated by Alberto Salvadore.
- 2018–2019, Museo del Risorgimento, Turin, Italy
- 2018, My Pupil is an Anvil, Nathalie Karg Gallery, New York
- 2016, The Third Ear, Nathalie Karg Gallery, New York

=== Group exhibitions ===
- 2023, To Bend the Ear of the Outer World: Gagosian Gallery, Curated by Gary Garrels, London, UK
- 2018, Kunsthall Stavanger, Norway
- 2017, Visionary Painting: Curated by Alex Katz, the Colby Museum of Art, Maine
- 2017, the Washington University Museum, Washington, D.C.
- 2016, A Way of Living, A Palazzo Gallery in Brescia, Italy
