= Olivia Rosenthal =

French novelist (born 1965)

Olivia Rosenthal (born 1965 in Paris) is a French novelist. She won the Candide Preis in 2009, and her novel Que font les rennes après Noël ? (2010) won the Prix du Livre Inter in 2011.
