= Fatih Mosque, Istanbul =

Mosque in Fatih, Istanbul, Turkey

Fatih Mosque
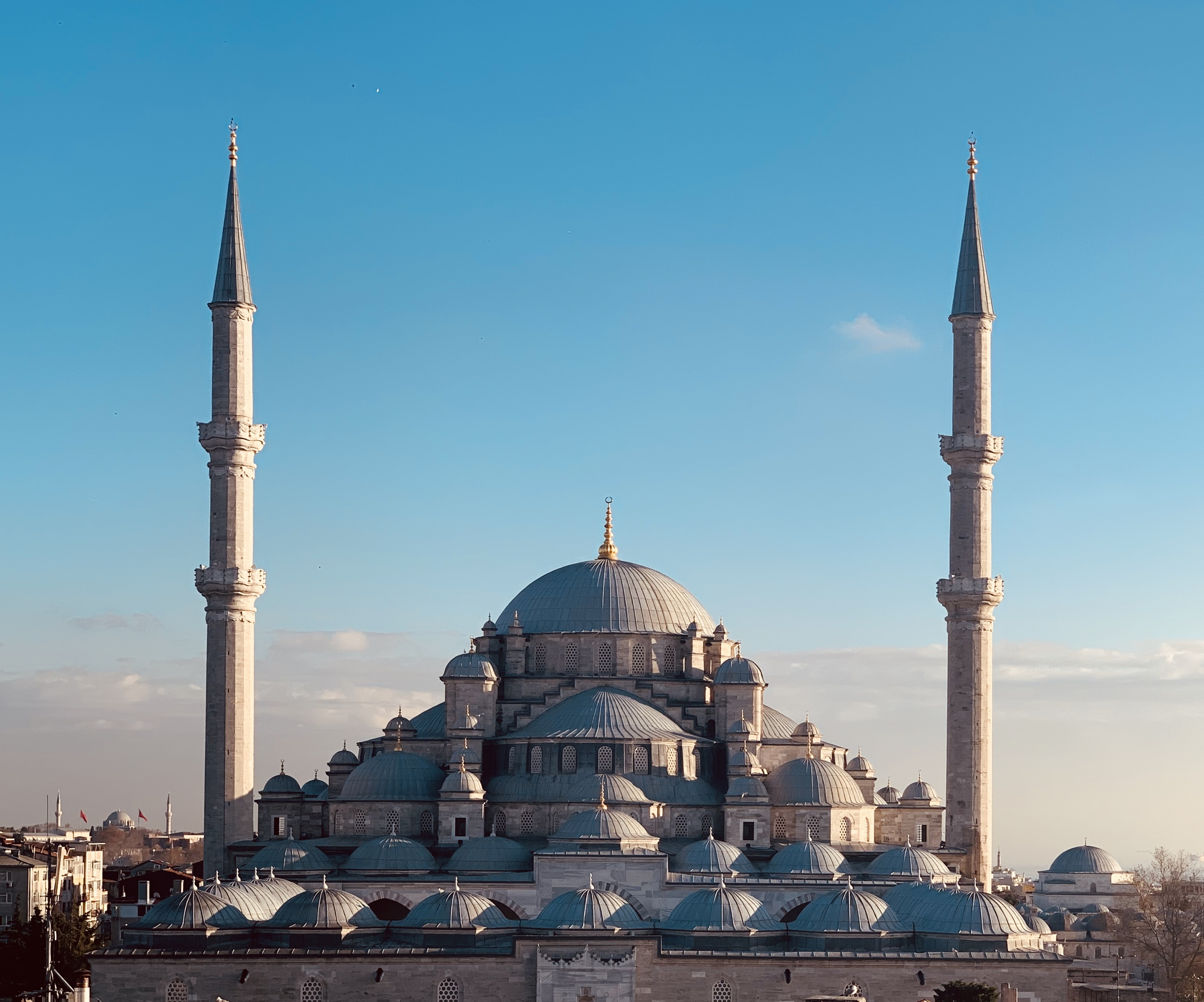

- Location in the Fatih district of Istanbul

Religion
- Affiliation: Sunni Islam

Location
- Location: Istanbul, Turkey
- Coordinates: 41°1′11″N 28°56′59″E

Architecture
- Architects: Atik Sinan, Mimar Mehmet Tahir
- Type: Mosque
- Groundbreaking: 1463
- Completed: 1470; 1771 (rebuilt after earthquake)

Specifications
- Dome dia. (inner): 26 meters (85 ft)
- Minaret: 2
- Materials: granite, marble

The Fatih Mosque (Turkish: Fatih Camii, lit. 'The Conqueror's mosque'; Ottoman Turkish: فاتح جامع) is an Ottoman mosque off Fevzi Paşa Caddesi in the Fatih district of Istanbul, Turkey. The original mosque was constructed between 1463 and 1470 on the site of the Church of the Holy Apostles. Seriously damaged in the 1766 earthquake, it was rebuilt in 1771 to a different design. It is named after the Ottoman sultan Mehmed the Conqueror, known in Turkish as Fatih Sultan Mehmed, who conquered Constantinople in 1453.

The Sahn-ı Seman Medrese, once an important center for the study of theology, law, medicine, astronomy, physics and mathematics, formed part of the Fatih Mosque. It was founded by the Turkic astronomer Ali Qushji who had been invited by Mehmed to his court in Istanbul.

The mosque complex was completely restored in 2009 and again ten years later. It reopened to worshippers in 2021.

== History ==
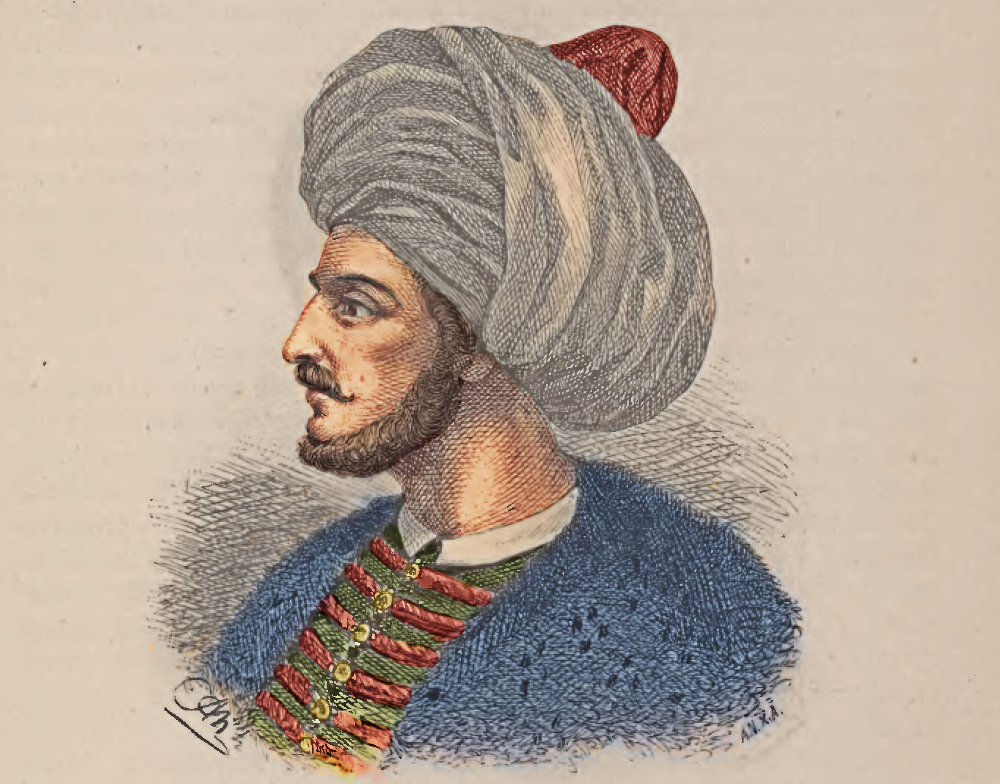
Portrait of Mehmed II who made the Church of the Holy Apostles in to Fatih Mosque

The Fatih Mosque complex was a religious and social building of unprecedented size and complexity built in Istanbul between 1463 and 1470 by order of Mehmed II. The 6th-century Church of the Holy Apostles, already derelict for some years, was demolished to make way for the mosque. The Byzantine church had fallen into disrepair since the Fourth Crusade. Even though it was the cathedral church of the Ecumenical Patriarchate of Constantinople, the Ecumenical Patriarch was not permitted to carry out essential repairs to the structure. The church was the burial place of numerous Roman emperors, including Constantine the Great. Before the construction of the mosque, his sarcophagus had been placed in the middle of twelve other sarcophagi representing the Twelve Apostles, in the symbolic place of Christ.

The Fatih Mosque was the first monumental project in the Ottoman imperial architectural tradition. It was built by the Greek architect Atik Sinan.

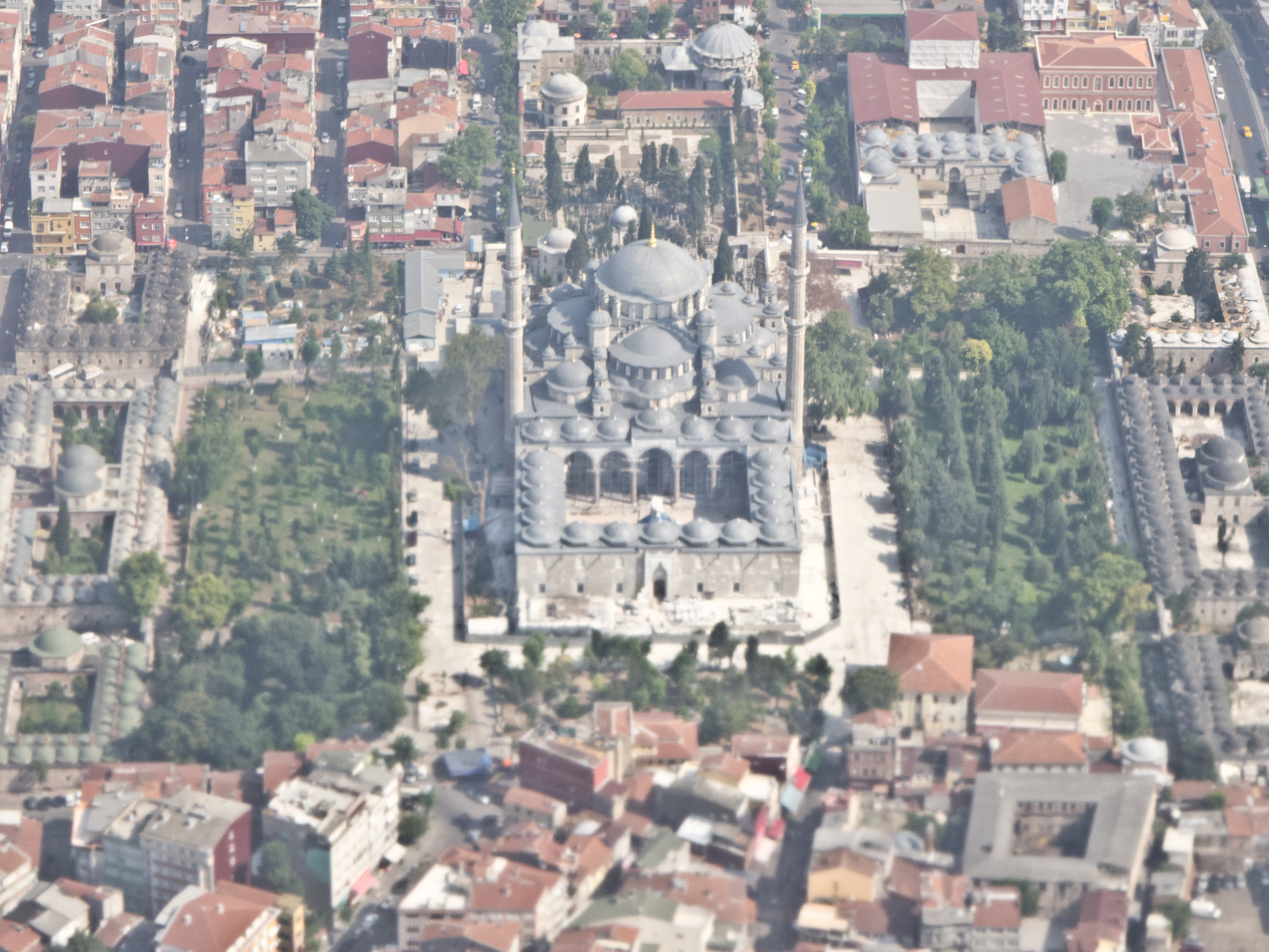
Aerial view of the Fatih Mosque and the surrounding külliye.

The original complex included eight medreses, a library, a hospital (darüşşifa), a dervish inn (taphane), a caravanserai, a market, a hamam, a primary school (mektep), a public kitchen (imaret) for the poor, and a collection of 280 shops. Various tombs (türbes) were added at later dates. The original complex covered an almost square area of 325 metres (1,066 feet), extending along the Golden Horn side of Fevzi Paşa Caddesi.

The first mosque was badly damaged in the 1509 earthquake. After that it was repaired, but was then damaged again by earthquakes in 1557 and 1754 and repaired yet again. It was then completely destroyed by an earthquake on 22 May 1766 when the main dome collapsed and the walls were irreparably damaged.

Commissioned by Sultan Mustafa III, the current mosque (designed on a completely different plan) was built between 1767 and 1771 by the architect Mehmet Tahir Ağa.

== Architecture ==
=== Exterior ===
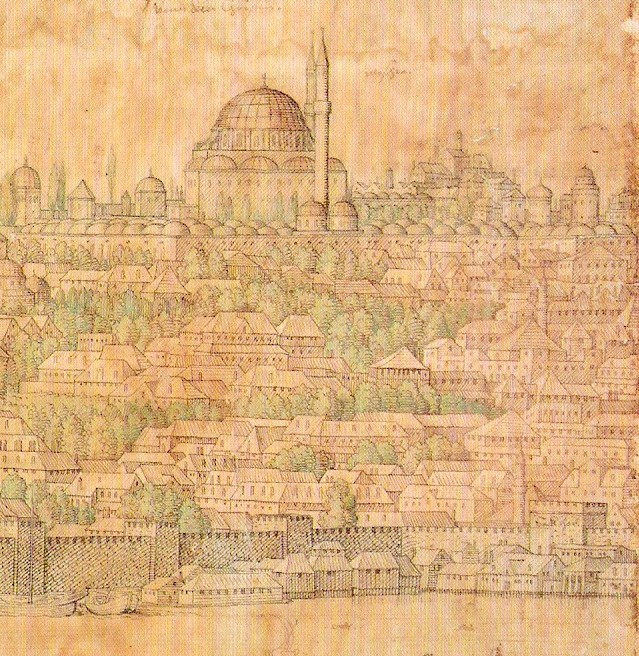
Appearance of the Fatih Mosque before the earthquake, painted in 1559.

The first Fatih Mosque had one central dome supported by a single semi-dome of the same diameter on the qibla side and suspended on four arches. its dome was 26 meters in diameter. The second Baroque mosque built after the 1766 earthquake had a square plan. It has one central dome supported by four semi-domes. Only the courtyard, main entrance portal and lower portions of the minarets survive from the original construction.

Reconstruction section of the original Fatih Mosque

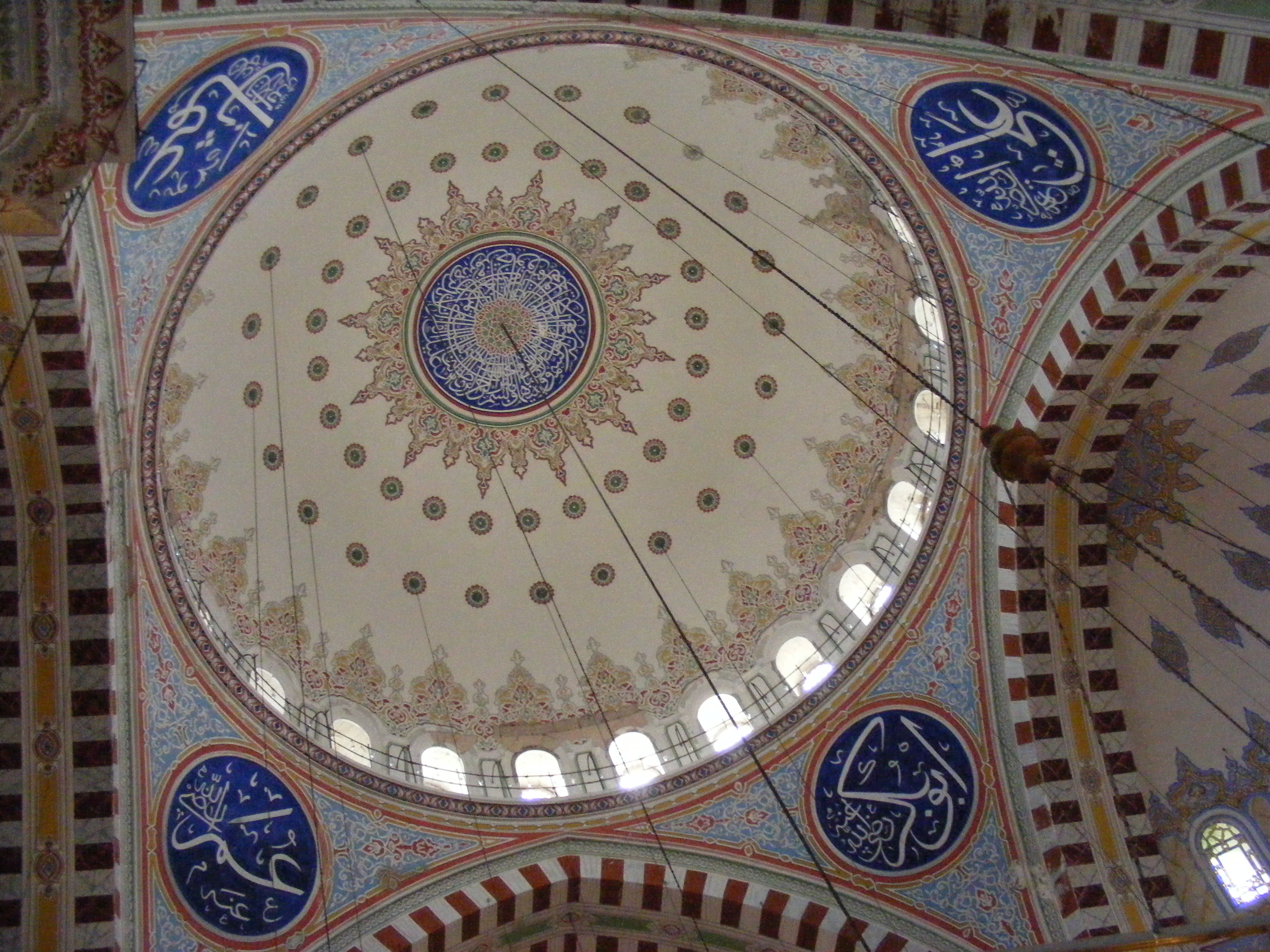
The Fatih Mosque Dome

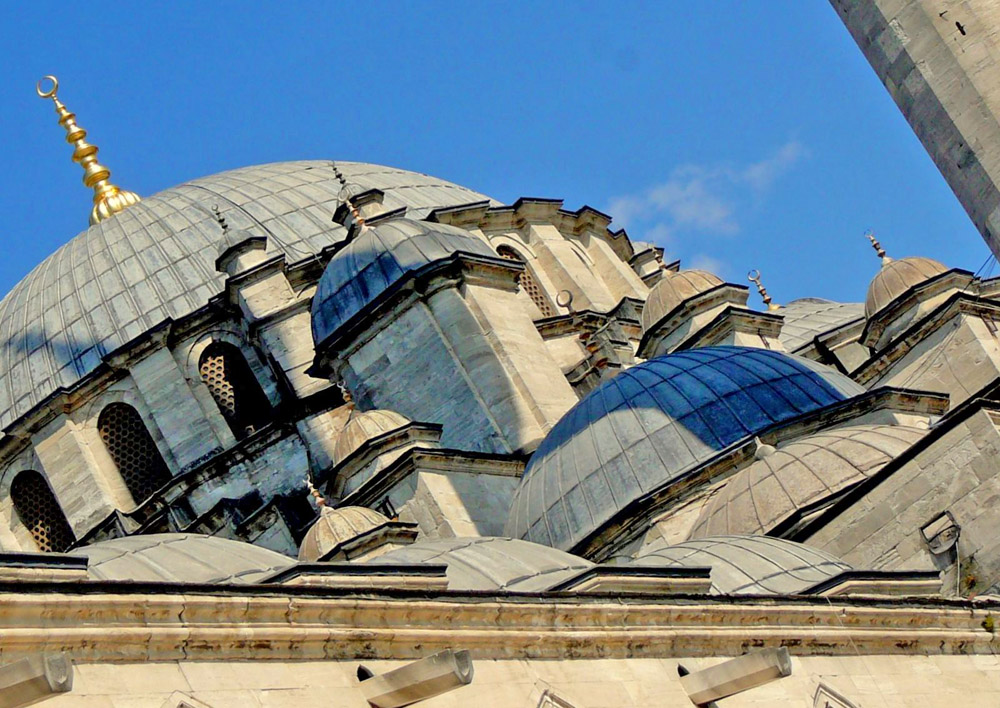
The Fatih Mosque Dome Outside

=== Interior ===
The present interior of the Fatih Mosque is essentially a copy of earlier designs invented by Sinan re-used repeatedly by himself and his successors throughout Istanbul (this technique is emulative of the Hagia Sophia). The 26 meter diameter center dome is supported by four semi-domes on each axis supported by four large marble columns. There are two minarets each with twin galleries. The calligraphy within the mosque and the mimbar exhibit a Baroque influence, but the white tiles lack the splendor of the İznik tiles used in other mosques such as the Rüstem Pasha Mosque.

The mihrab survived from the original construction.

=== Complex ===
As with other imperial mosques in Istanbul, the Fatih Mosque was designed as a kulliye, or complex with adjacent structures to service both religious and cultural needs.

To the north and south of the mosque are the Sahn-ı Seman, eight great medreses, four on each side. These buildings are symmetrical, and each contains 18 cells for four students and a dershane. Annexes behind the medrese itself were lost to road construction. The medreses provided for about a thousand students, making it a large university for its time.

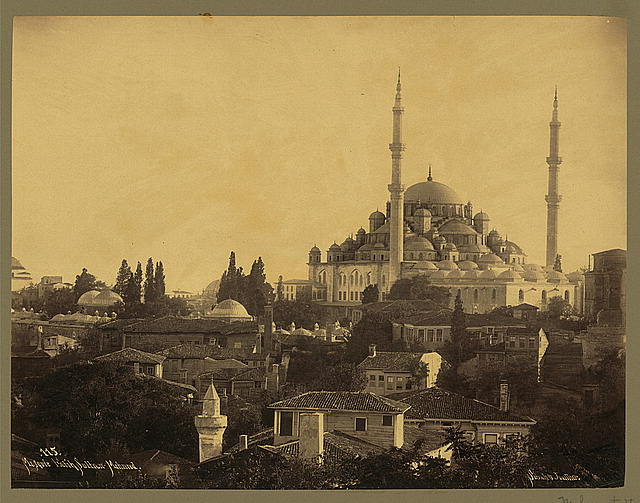
Historical photo taken between 1888 and 1910

The dervish inn, outside the southeast corner of the mosque precincts, has a courtyard supported by 16 different columns of verd antique and granite, probably salvaged from the Church of the Holy Apostles.

Facing the dervish inn is the large Baroque türbe of Sultan Mahmud II's mother, Nakşidil Sultan (1761-1817).

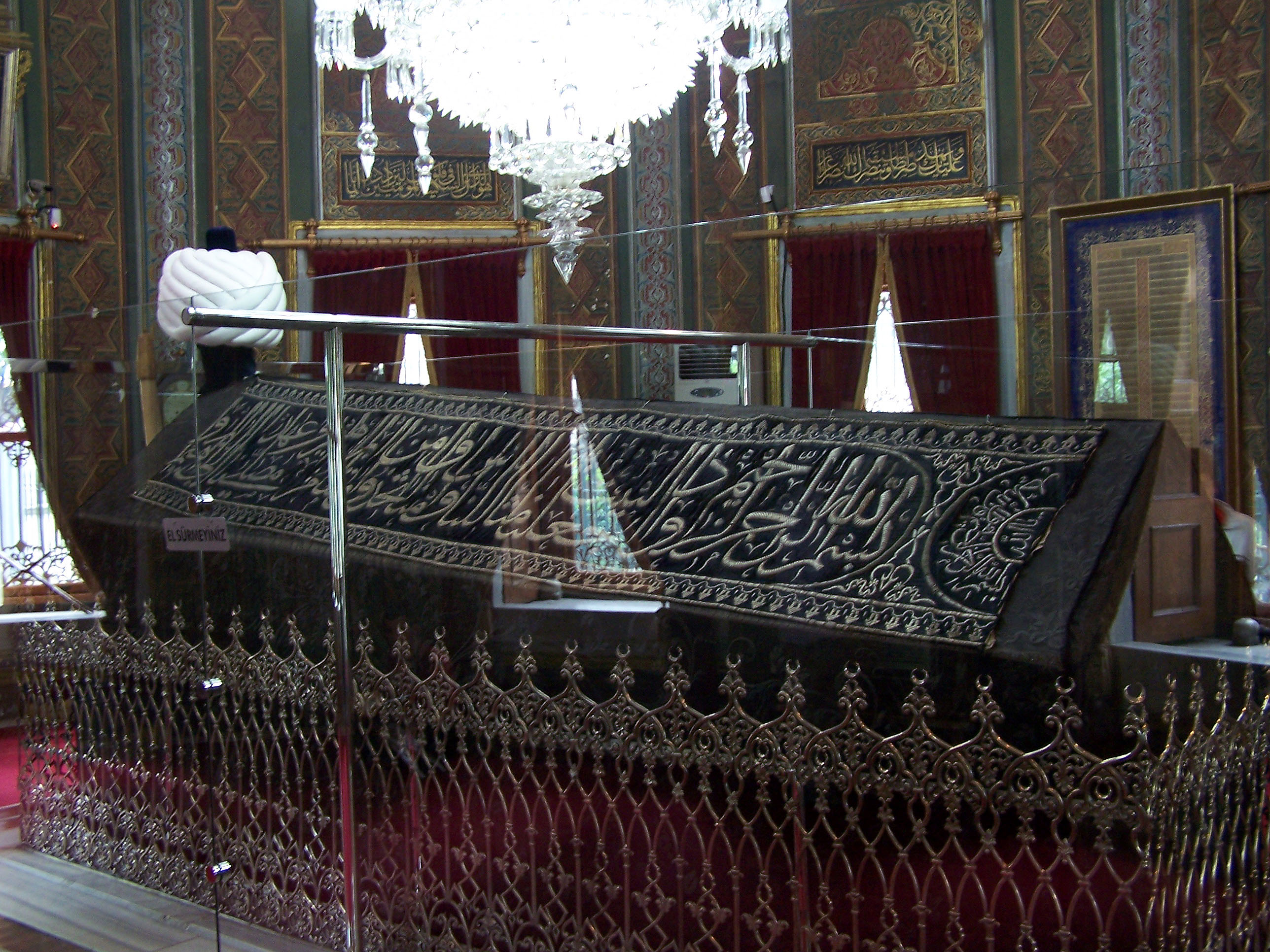
The tomb of Mehmed II (d. 1481)

The graveyard beside the mosque contains the tombs (türbes) of Sultan Mehmed II and his consort Gülbahar Hatun. Both were reconstructed after the earthquake. The türbe of the Conqueror has a lavishly decorated interior and is a popular site for official ceremonies. It was customary for new sultans to visit the tomb immediately after being invested with the Sword of Osman at Eyüp Sultan Mosque. Gulbahar's türbe is more simple, with classic lines, and may closely resemble the original. The graveyard also contains the last resting places of many important state officials, including field marshal Gazi Osman Pasha whose tomb was designed by Kemaleddin Bey. The distinguished Ottoman scholar and university professor Halil İnalcık was buried here in 2016.

On one side of the mosque and connected to it is the domed Carullah Efendi Library which was built in 1724. One of its doors opens onto the street, while the other two open onto the inner courtyard of the mosque. The library is undergoing repairs, and the books are under protection at the Suleymaniye Library.

The caravanserai was repaired in the 1980s and combined with new shops to begin functioning as a workplace. The hospital, market, kitchens and hamam of the original complex have been lost.

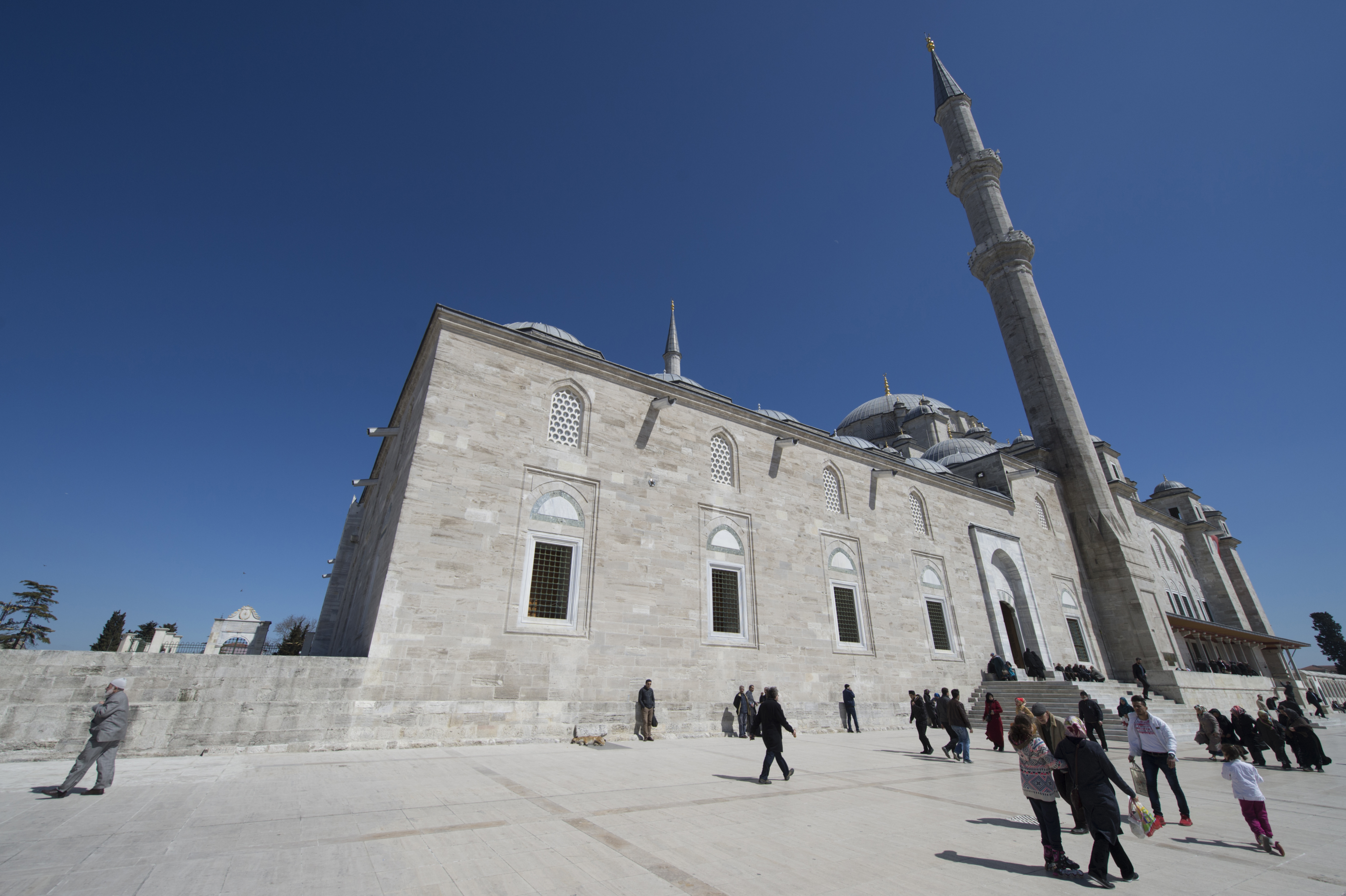
Fatih Mosque west side

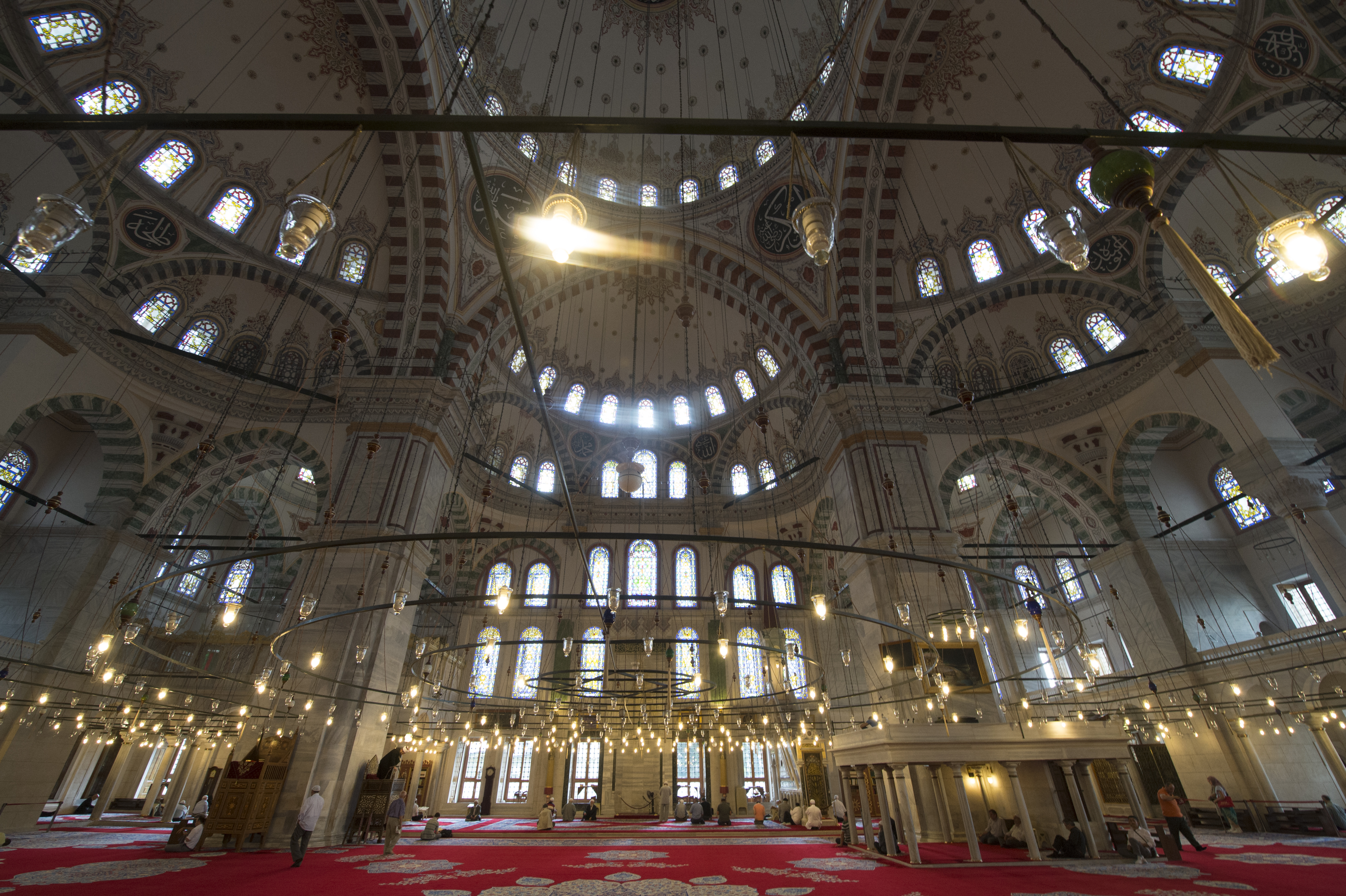
Fatih Mosque interior

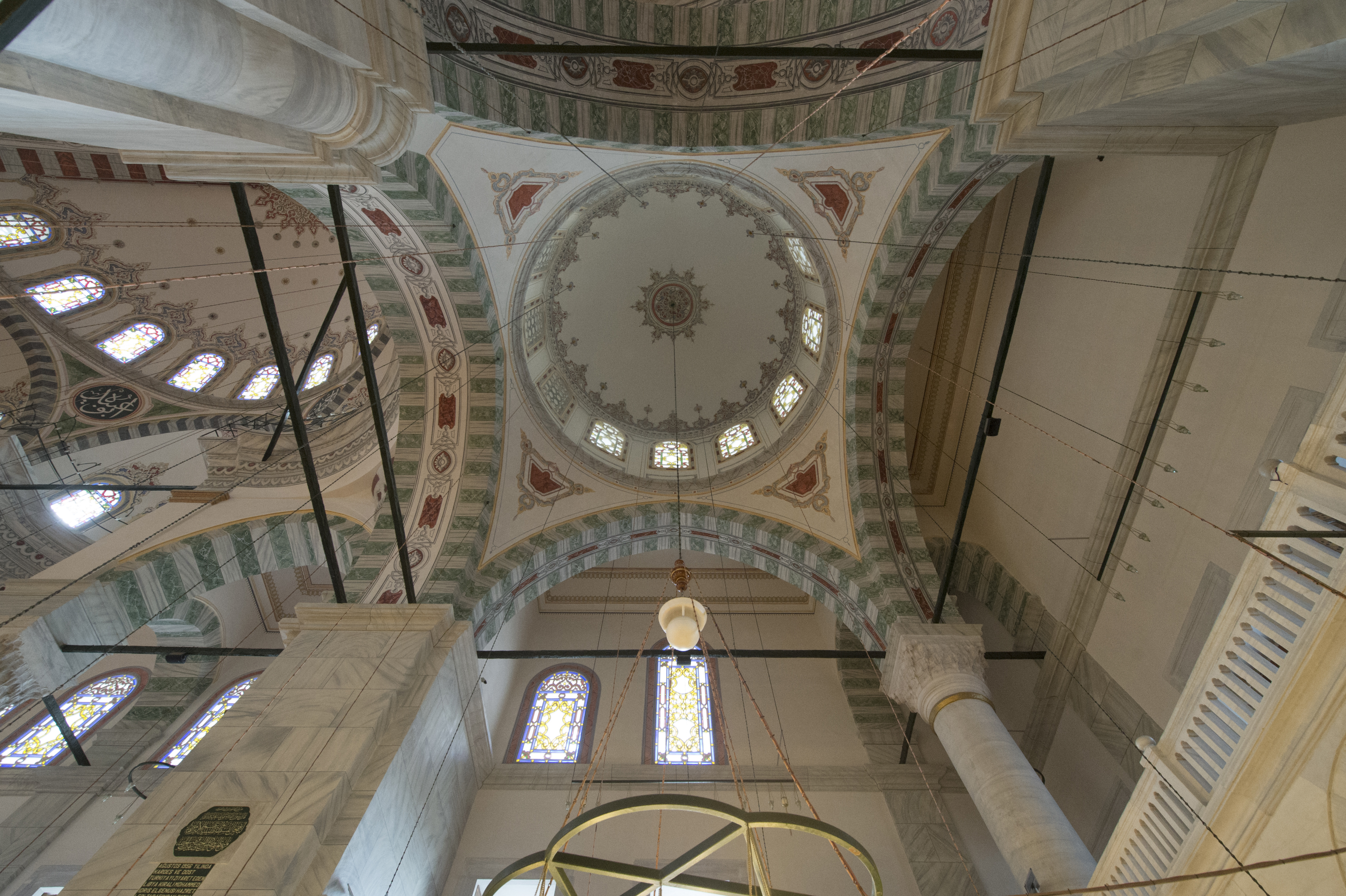
Fatih Mosque ceiling

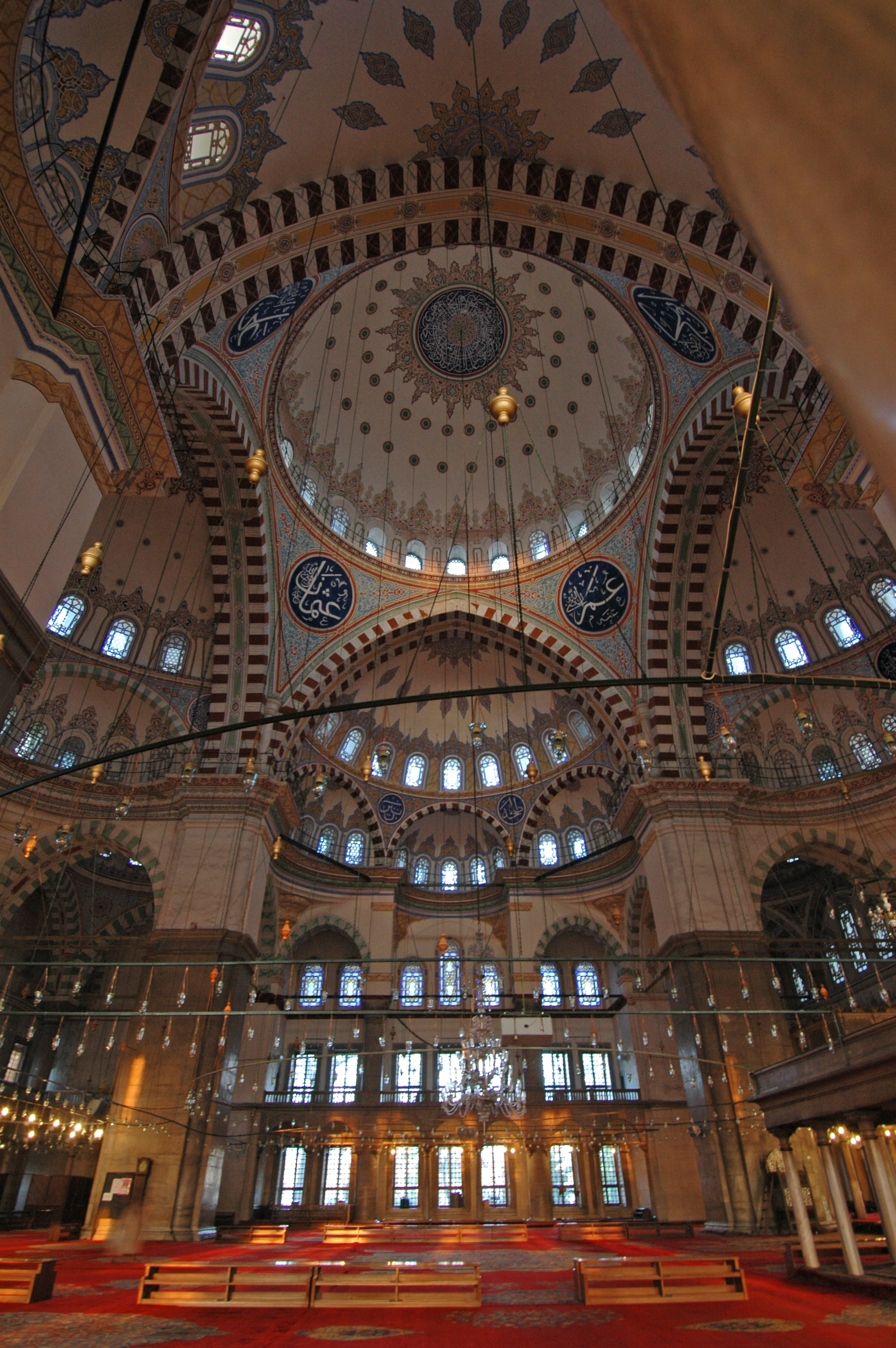
Fatih Mosque interior

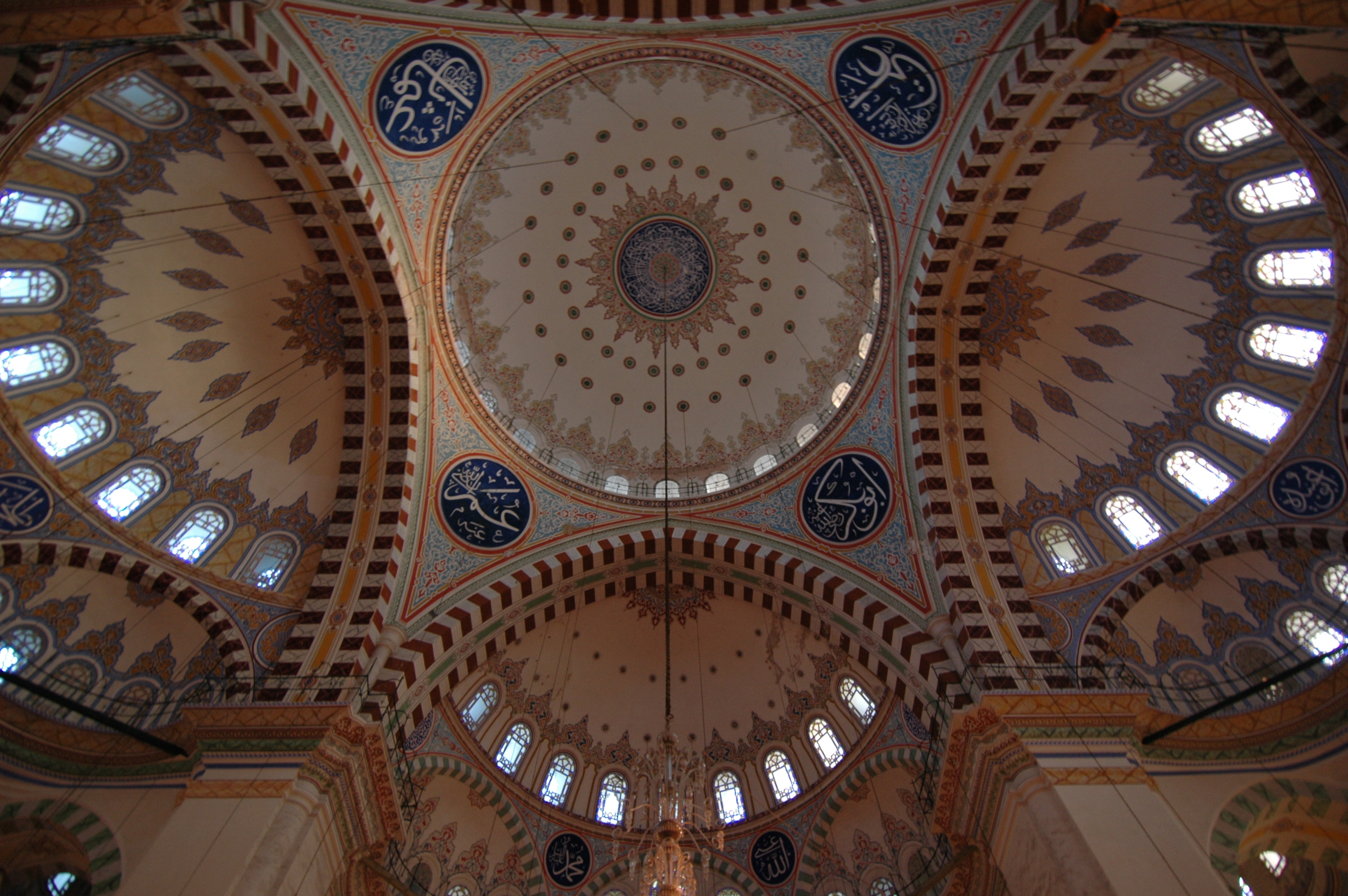
Fatih Mosque Domes

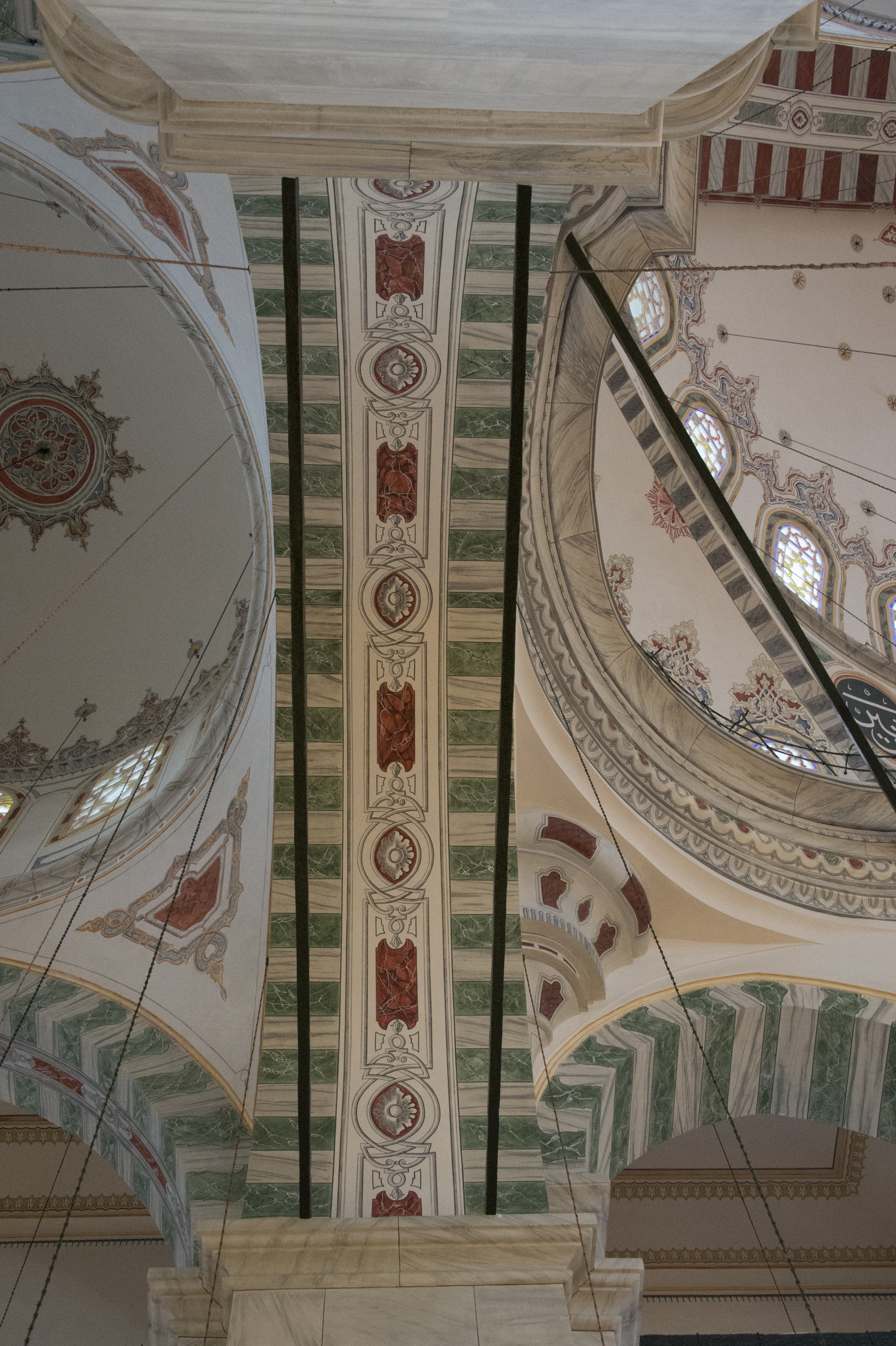
Fatih Mosque decoration

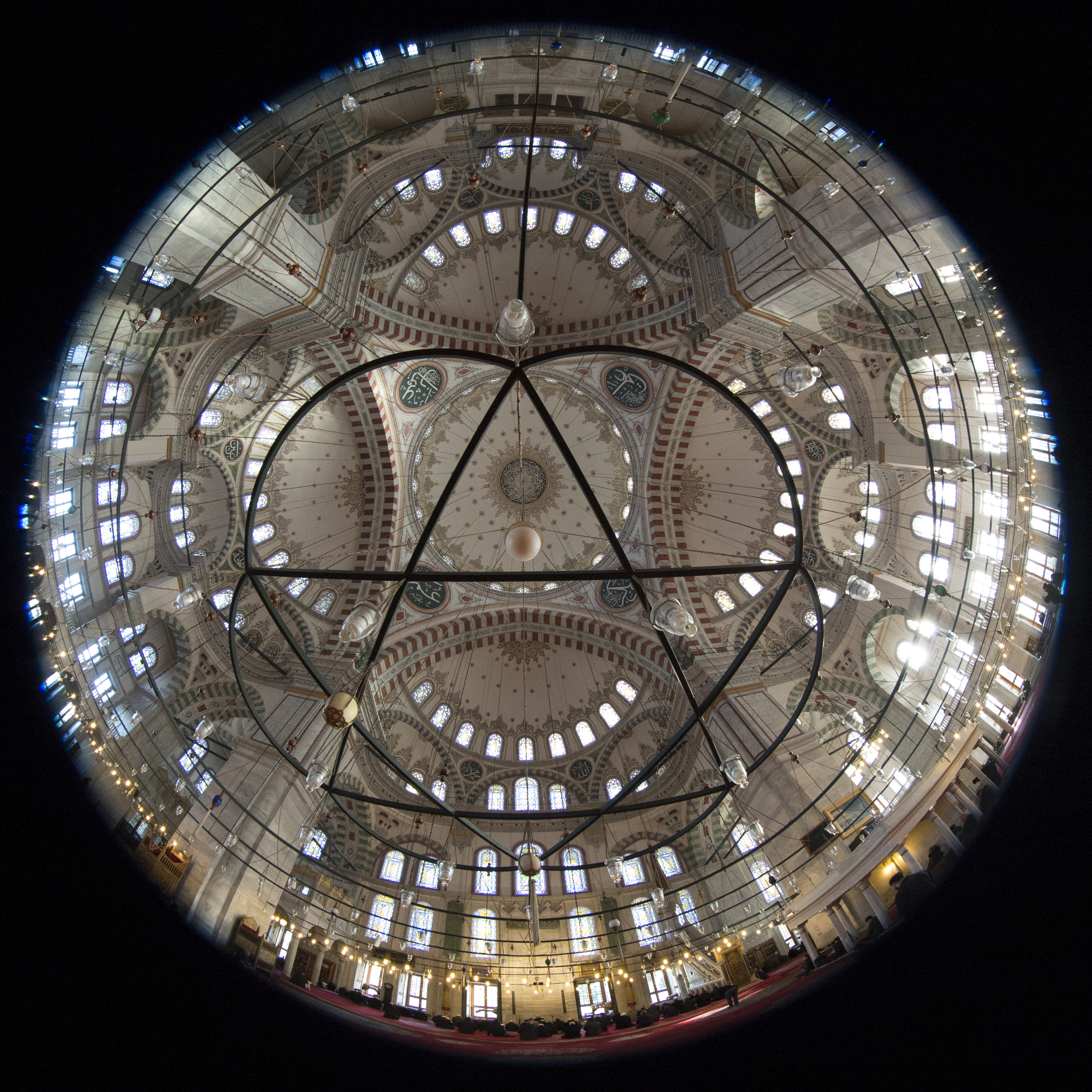
Fatih Sultan Mosque fish eye

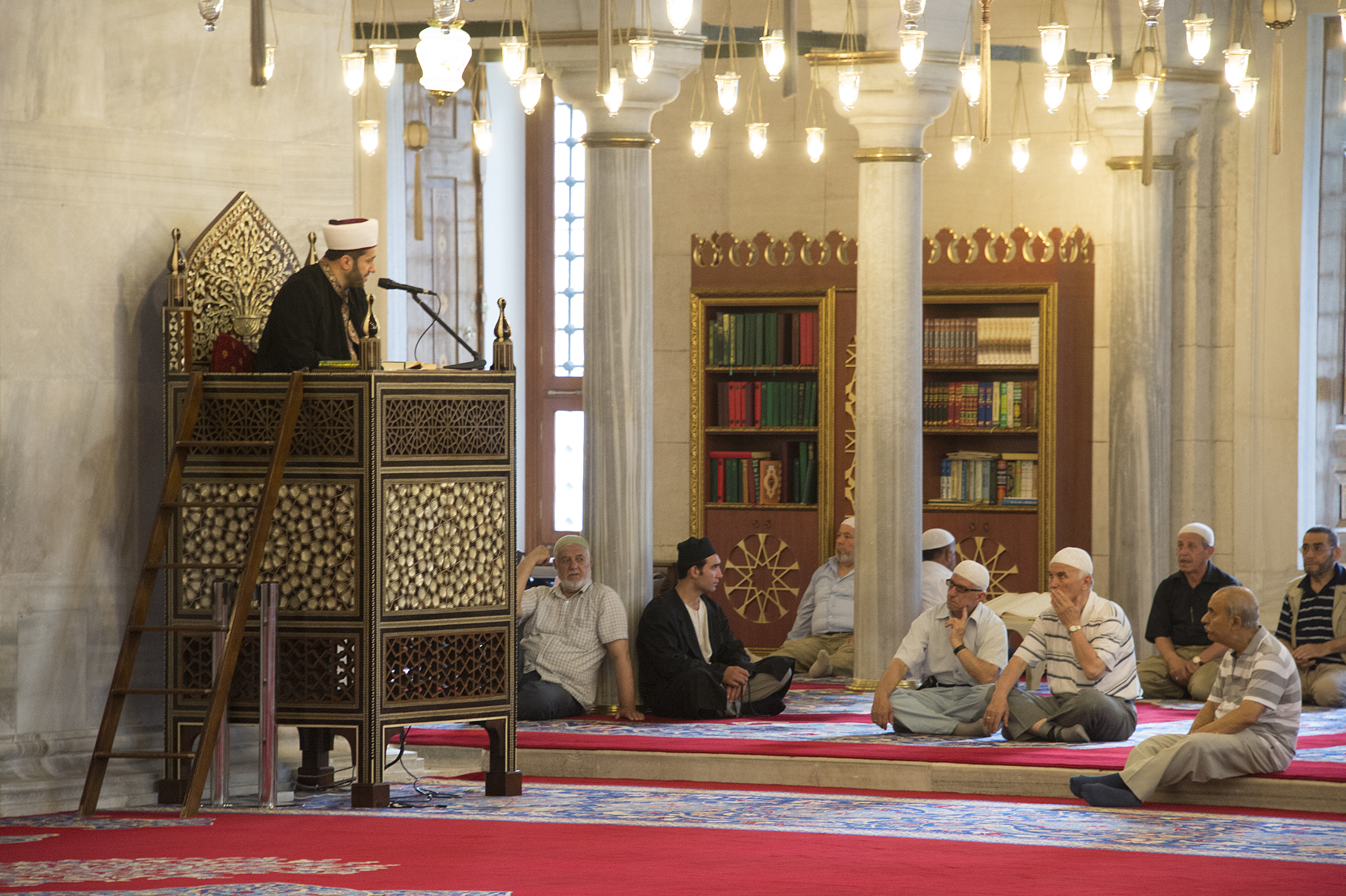
Fatih Mosque group

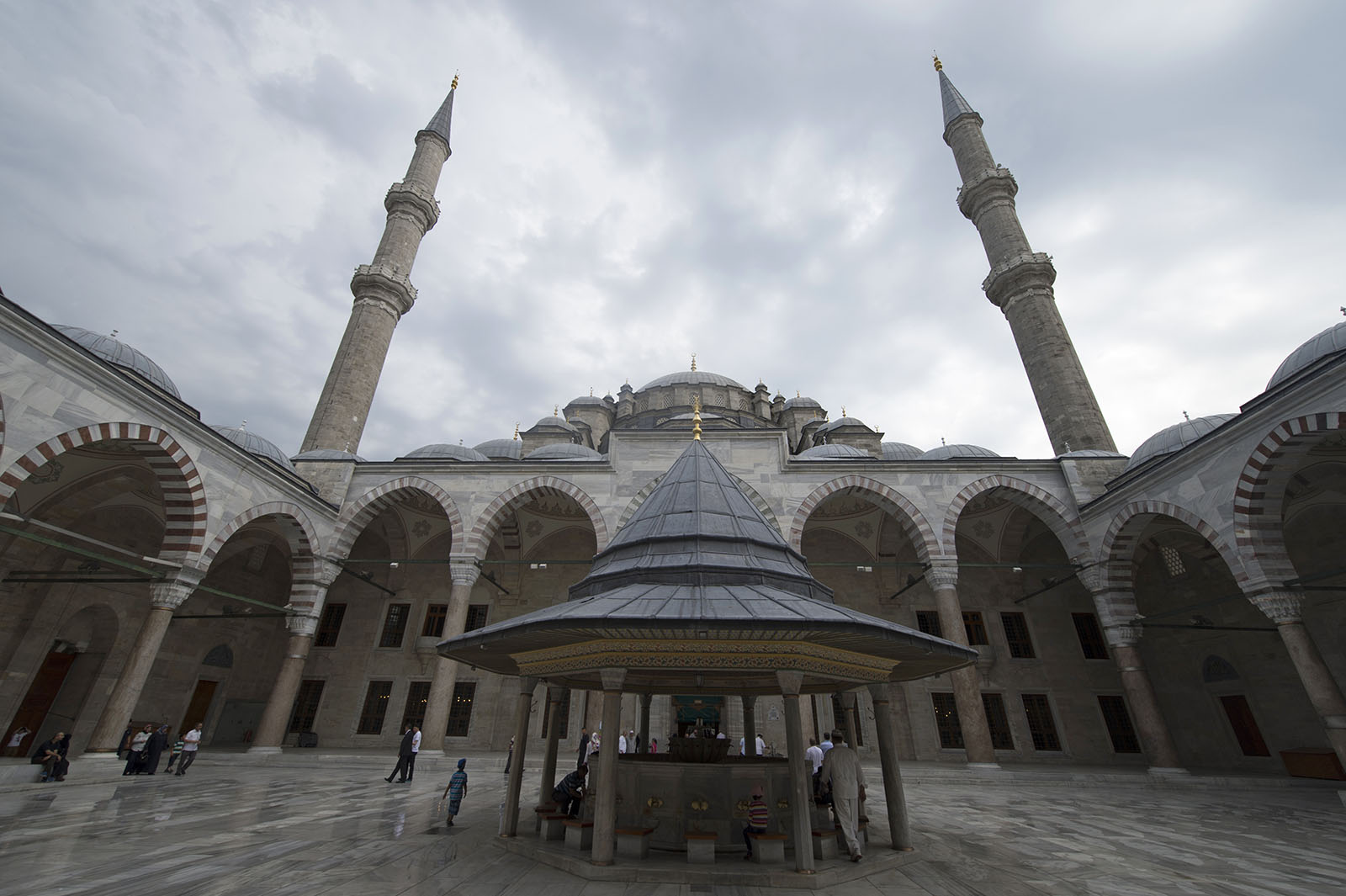
Fatih Mosque courtyard

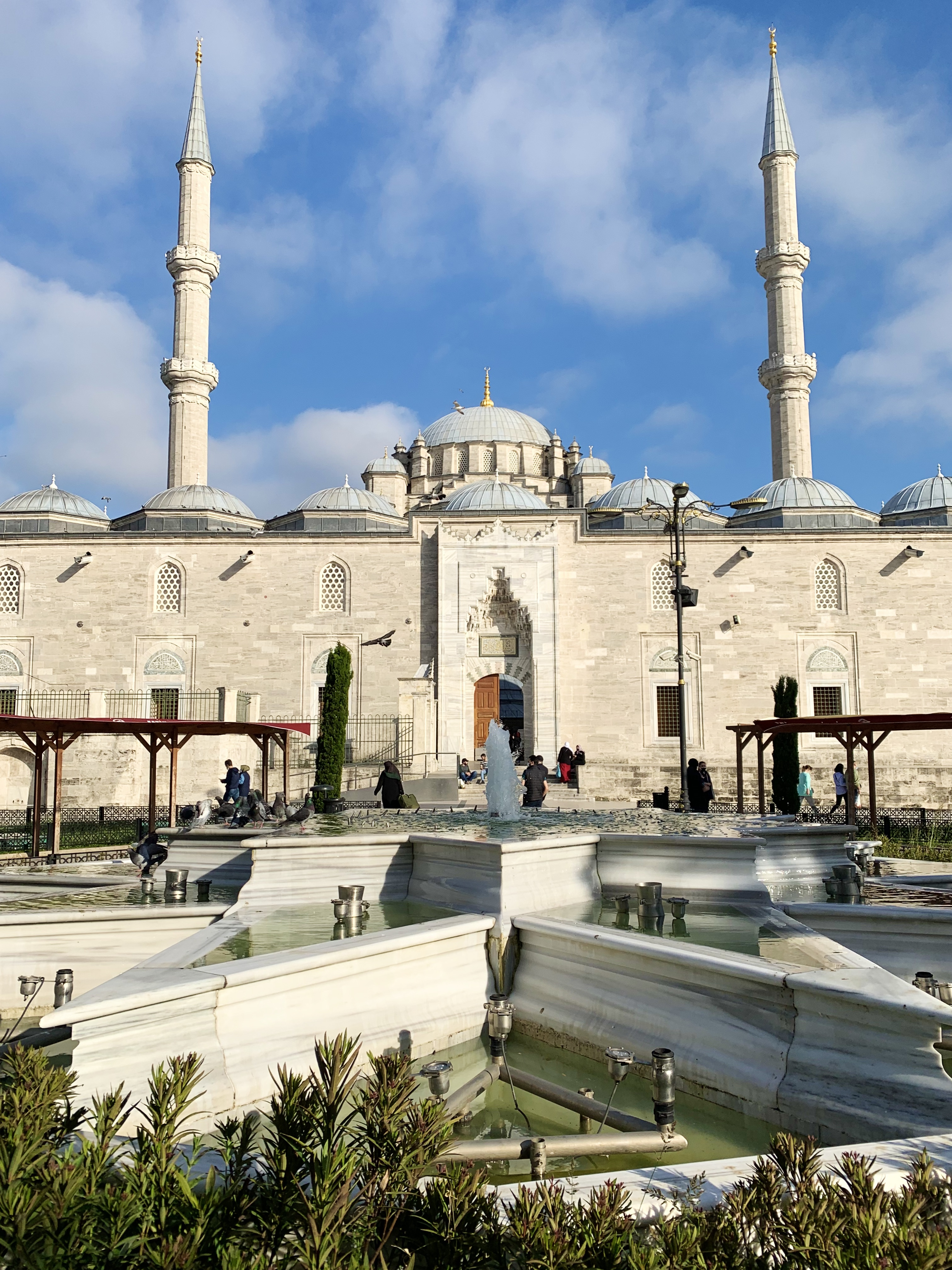
Fatih Mosque courtyard

== Influences ==
According to the Turkish historian Mehmet Aga-Oglu, the mosque is a representation of Islamic Persian medresse architecture and not Byzantine church architecture. This opinion is supported by other Turkish academics that state Ottoman architecture is an extension of "Near Eastern architectural tradition".

== See also ==
- List of mosques
- Ottoman architecture
