= Mathias Énard =

French novelist born 1972

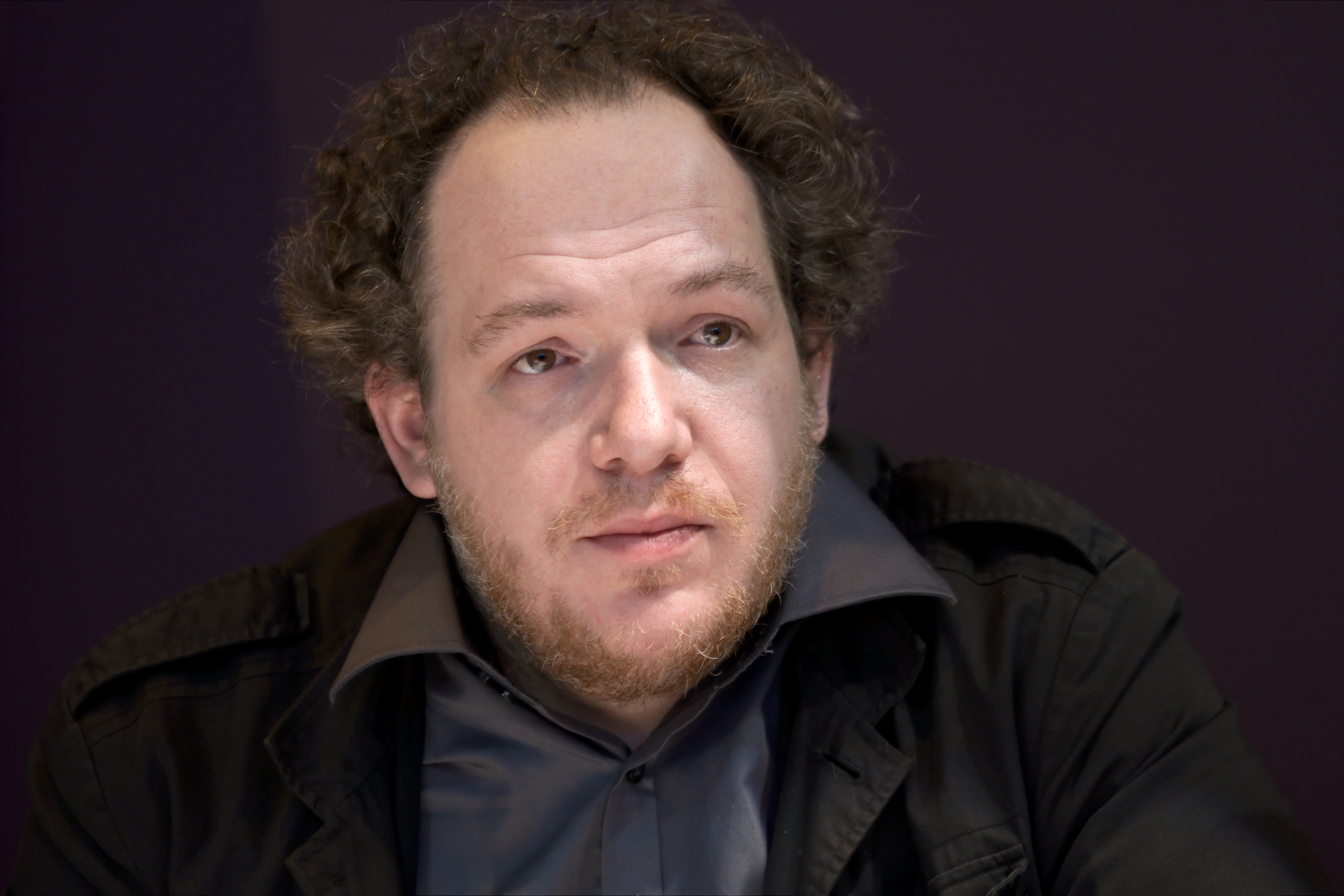
- Mathias Énard in 2010
- Born: January 11, 1972 (age 54); Niort, France
- Education: Institut national des langues et civilisations orientales École du Louvre
- Occupations: Author, translator, professor
- Writing career
- Notable works: La Perfection du tir (2003); Zone (2008); Tell Them of Battles, Kings, and Elephants (2010); Compass (2015)

Mathias Énard (born January 11, 1972) is a French writer and translator. He is the recipient of several literary awards, including the Prix Goncourt in 2015, for his novel Compass. From 2020 to 2025, he produced and hosted a literary program on France Culture.

== Early life ==
Énard was raised in Poitou by “a special ed teacher from Nice and a Basque speech therapist.” After studying at the École du Louvre, he continued his studies in Arabic and Persian at INALCO, where he wrote his thesis on “post-war Arabic and Persian poetry and its relationship with European literature.”

He did his military service in Syria, where he spent two years in Sweida, giving French classes at a cultural centre.

== Career ==
In 2000 Énard moved to Barcelona, where he edited several cultural magazines. He then lived in Rome and Berlin. He has translated two books, one from Persian and the other from Arabic. He also served on the editorial board of the magazine Inculte in Paris. In 2009, he taught Arabic at the Autonomous University of Barcelona.

Énard’s first novel, La Perfection du tir, was released in 2003. It is the story of a sniper during a nameless country’s civil war and his obsession with death. It won the Prix des cinq continents de la francophonie and the Prix Edmée-de-La-Rochefoucauld. It was also selected for the 2004 edition of the Festival du premier roman.

From 2005 to 2006, Énard was a resident at the French Academy in Rome.

Actes Sud published his novel Zone in 2008. It consists primarily of a single long sentence over its five hundred pages, with exceptions for three chapters, which are excerpts from a book the narrator is reading. It was awarded many prizes, including the Prix Décembre, the Candide Preis, and the Prix du Livre Inter.

In 2010, he published Tell Them of Battles, Kings, and Elephants, a short story based on a likely fictional episode in the life of Michelangelo. It tells the story of a trip to Constantinople, where Michelangelo arrived on May 13, 1506, at the invitation of Sultan Bayezid II. It depicts a tolerant, European Constantinople that welcomes Jews expelled from Spain by the Catholic monarchs. It received the 2010 Prix Goncourt des Lycéens and the 25th Prix du Livre en Poitou-Charentes & La Voix des Lecteurs.

Énard founded the contemporary art publishing house Scrawitch in 2011. A gallery by the same name existed until 2014 in the 11th arrondissement in Paris, co-founded with lithographer Thomas Marin and philosopher Julien Bézille.

In 2012, Énard published Street of Thieves, the story of a young Moroccan man wandering around Spain during the Arab Spring and of the anti-austerity movement in Spain. At the 2012 edition of the Beirut Francophone Book Fair, the book received the first Liste Goncourt: Le choix de l'Orient prize, awarded by a jury of students from universities in Lebanon and other Middle Eastern countries. The book also received the Prix de l'Académie littéraire de Bretagne et des Pays de la Loire in 2013.

His 2015 novel Compass, which deals with the West's view of the Orient, was awarded the Prix Goncourt.

Énard co-wrote the graphic novel Prendre refuge with illustrator Zeina Abirached in 2018.

In 2020 he was Friedrich Dürrenmatt Guest Professor for World Literature at the University of Bern. He hosted and produced the radio program L'entretien littéraire on France Culture on Sundays from the beginning of the 2020 academic year until the program's end in June 2025.

At the end of 2020, Énard's novel The Annual Banquet of the Gravediggers’ Guild, which he worked on for 10 years, was published. Many of the book's stories take place in his hometown of Niort, in the Poitou region.

In 2024 he published Mélancolie des confins – Nord, the first volume in a series of four books that comprise a cycle according to the four cardinal directions. The second volume was released in 2026, under the title Hôtel Balkan (Mélancolie des confins II – Est).

In 2026, The Deserters, Charlotte Mandell's English translation of Énard's 2023 novel Déserter, was longlisted for the International Booker Prize.

== Works ==
=== Novels ===
- (2003) La Perfection du tir (Perfecting the Shot, English ed. 2026)
- (2005) Remonter l'Orénoque
- (2007) Bréviaire des artificiers
- (2008) Zone (English ed. 2010)
- (2010) Parle-leur de batailles, de rois et d'éléphants (Tell Them of Battles, Kings, and Elephants, English ed. 2018)
- (2011) L'alcool et la nostalgie
- (2012) Rue des voleurs (Street of Thieves, English ed. 2014)
- (2015) Boussole (Compass, English ed. 2017)
- (2018) Désir pour désir
- (2020) Le Banquet annuel de la Confrérie des fossoyeurs (The Annual Banquet of the Gravediggers’ Guild, English ed. 2023)
- (2023) Déserter (The Deserters, English ed. 2025)

=== Graphic Novels ===
- (2013) Tout sera oublié. Illustrated by Pierre Marquès.
- (2018) Prendre refuge. Co-written with and illustrated by Zeina Abirached.

=== Children’s Books ===
- (2009) Mangée, mangée !. Illustrated by Pierre Marquès.

=== Poetry ===
- (2016) Dernière communication à la société proustienne de Barcelone

=== Non-fiction ===
- (2020) J'y mets ma langue à couper
- (2024) Mélancolie des confins – Nord
- (2026) Hôtel Balkan (Mélancolie des confins II – Est)

== Awards and honours ==
- 2004 Prix des cinq continents de la francophonie for La Perfection du tir
- 2004 Prix Edmée-de-La-Rochefoucauld for La Perfection du tir
- 2008 Prix Décembre for Zone
- 2008 Prix Candide for Zone
- 2008 Bourse Thyde-Monnier SGDL for Zone
- 2008 Prix Cadmous for Zone
- 2009 Prix Initiales for Zone
- 2009 Inter Book Prize for Zone
- 2010 Prix Goncourt des Lycéens for Parle-leur de batailles, de rois et d'élephants
- 2013 Prix Roman-News for Rue des voleurs
- 2015 Best Translated Book Award longlist for Street of Thieves, translated by Charlotte Mandell
- 2015 Prix Goncourt for Boussole
- 2016 Officer of the Order of Arts and Letters
- 2017 Man Booker International Prize shortlist for Compass, translated by Charlotte Mandell
- 2017 Premio Gregor von Rezzori – Città di Firenze for Bussola
- 2017 Leipzig Book Award for European Understanding

== See also ==
- Candide Preis
