= Claude Arnaud =

French writer, essayist, biographer

Claude Arnaud (born 24 April 1955 in Paris) is a French writer, essayist, and biographer. He won the 2006 Prix Femina Essai.

== Biography ==
He worked as an offset printing activist and participated in the Workers' Struggle.

From 1977–83 he worked in "Film" monthly, led by Jacques Fieschi. He studied literature at the University of Vincennes. He wrote a play about "the redemptive powers of love," with Bernard Minoret, "Les salons" ("Trade shows"). In 1988, he published a biography of Nicolas Chamfort.

== Villa Medicis ==
He was Resident at the Villa Medici in Rome in 1989 and 1990.

== Works ==
- Bernard Minoret, Claude Arnaud, Les salons, J.C. Lattès, 1985
- Chamfort, a biography. University of Chicago Press. 1992. ISBN 978-0-226-02697-8. "Claude Arnaud."
- Le caméléon: roman, B. Grasset, 1994, ISBN 978-2-246-45601-8
- Le jeu des quatre coins: roman, B. Grasset, 1998, ISBN 978-2-246-53881-3
- Jean Cocteau, Gallimard, 2003, ISBN 978-2-07-075233-1
- Qui dit je en nous: une histoire subjective de l'identité, Grasset, 2006, ISBN 978-2-246-69981-1
- Babel 1990: Rome, Saint-Pétersbourg, New York, Gallimard, 2008, ISBN 978-2-07-034884-8
- Qu'as-tu fait de tes frères?, Grasset & Fasquelle, 2010, ISBN 978-2-246-77111-1
- John Richardson, Elizabeth Cowling, Claude Arnaud, Picasso: the Mediterranean years 1945–1962, Rizzoli, 2010, ISBN 978-0-8478-3535-5
- Les chemins creux, Editions Graine d'Auteur, 2011, ISBN 978-2-35663-018-6
