= Lauren Elkin =

Writer and translator (born 1978)

- Lauren Elkin in 2023
- Born: October 11, 1978 (age 48)
- Occupations: Writer and translator
- Writing career
- Notable work: Art Monsters: Unruly Bodies in Feminist Art
- Website: www.laurenelkin.com

Lauren Elkin is a French and American writer, essayist and translator. She is known for her book, Art Monsters: Unruly Bodies in Feminist Art and Flâneuse, which was among the list of notable books by The New York Times Book Review and a finalist for the PEN/Diamonstein-Spielvogel Award for the Art of the Essay.

Her work has appeared in The New York Times, Granta, Le Monde, and Frieze. She was the English translator of Simone de Beauvoir's The Inseparables as well as The Image of Her. She previously lectured at the University of Liverpool's Department of English and the American University of Paris's Creative Writing MFA.

Her debut novel, Scaffolding, was published in June 2024 in the U.K. and September 2024 in the U.S. It was shortlisted for the VCU Cabell First Novelist Award and was the runner-up for the McKitterick Prize. It was a New York Times editor's choice, and was named one of the best books of the year by The New Yorker, Vanity Fair, and The New Statesman.

== Early and personal life ==
Elkin attended Barnard College and graduated in 2000. She holds an MPhil in French literature from the Sorbonne and a PhD in English literature from the CUNY Graduate Center and the Université de Paris Denis Diderot. A native New Yorker, Elkin lived in Paris, France for 20 years and is now based in London.

== Works ==
- The End of Oulipo? An Attempt to Exhaust a Movement (Zero) 2013 - with Veronica Scott Esposito
- Flâneuse: Women Walk the City (Chatto & Windus/FSG) 2016/2017.
- No. 91/92: A Diary of a Year on the Bus (Semiotext(e)/Les Fugitives) 2021.
- Art Monsters: Unruly Bodies in Feminist Art (Chatto & Windus/FSG) 2023.
- Scaffolding (Chatto & Windus/FSG) 2024.
- Vocal Break: On Women, Music, and Power (Chatto & Windus/FSG) 2026.
