= Compass (novel) =

Novel by Mathias Énard

- First edition (French)
- Author: Mathias Énard
- Original title: Boussole
- Translator: Charlotte Mandell..
- Language: French
- Publisher: Actes Sud
- Publication date: 2015
- Publication place: France
- English publication date: 2017
- ISBN: 9780811226622

Compass (French: Boussole) is a novel by the French writer Mathias Énard, published in 2015.

The book received the Prix Goncourt.

== Premise ==
During a sleepless night in Vienna, the musicologist Franz Ritter looks back on his life, his university career, his stays in the Orient, and his love, Sarah.

== Reception ==
Writing in Le Monde, Raphaëlle Leyris remarked that if Énard's earlier novel Zone was a book of violence and hate, Compass may be the antidote with the taste of the unknown and curiosity for the other at its heart. Phillipe Lançon described Compass as an ‘intimate and effusive encyclopedia disguised as a novel’. He went on to make reference to Enard's erudition and background as an orientalist.

In a piece on Orientalism published in the New York Review of Books, Adam Shatz argued that with Compass Enard had failed to ‘transcend the oppressive nature of Orientalism, via paradoxically, the Orientalist tradition itself’. The novel has also been described in the press as a ‘masterful novel’ that recognises the contribution of Islamic and Middle Eastern cultures to the canon, ‘lyrically and intellectually rich’, and a ‘powerful work’ that also threatens to send the reader to sleep with its level of detail.

== See also ==
- 2015 in literature
- Contemporary French literature
