= 1509 Constantinople earthquake =

Earthquake in the Sea of Marmara

- Location within Marmara
- Local date: 10 September 1509
- Local time: 22:00
- Magnitude: M_{s}7.2 ± 0.3
- Epicenter: 40.75°N 29.00°E near the Prince's Islands, Sea of Marmara
- Fault: North Anatolian Fault
- Areas affected: Ottoman Empire
- Tsunami: Yes
- Casualties: 1,000 to 13,000 dead 10,000 + injured 1070 houses destroyed

The 1509 Constantinople earthquake, or historically Kıyamet-i Suğra ('Minor Judgment Day'), occurred in the Sea of Marmara on 10 September 1509 at about 22:00. The earthquake had an estimated magnitude of 7.2 ± 0.3 on the surface-wave magnitude scale. A tsunami and 45 days of aftershocks followed the earthquake. The exact death toll of this earthquake is unknown; estimates range between 1,000 and 13,000.

== Background ==
The Sea of Marmara is a pull-apart basin formed at a releasing bend in the North Anatolian Fault, a right-lateral strike-slip fault. This local zone of extension occurs where this transform boundary between the Anatolian plate and the Eurasian plate steps northwards to the west of Izmit from the Izmit Fault to the Ganos Fault. The pattern of faults within the Sea of Marmara basin is complex but near Istanbul there is a single main fault segment with a sharp bend. To the west, the fault trends west–east and is pure strike-slip in type. To the east, the fault is NW-SE trending and shows evidence of both normal and strike-slip motion. Major shocks occurred at half-hour intervals and were violent and protracted in nature, forcing residents to seek refuge in open parks and squares. Aftershocks were said to have continued for 18 days without causing any further damage but delayed reconstruction in some areas.

A tsunami is mentioned in some sources with a run-up of greater than 6.0 m (19.7 ft), but discounted in others. The waves that surpassed the walls of the city and the Genoese Walls penetrated into the settlements. Especially in the Galata region, many houses were flooded. Seismologists and geologists believe that the tsunami observed in the Sea of Marmara was not only related to the earthquake, but also caused by seafloor landslides triggered by the earthquake. A turbidite bed whose deposition matches the date of the earthquake has been recognised in the Çınarcık Basin.

Reports were sent to the capital that the earthquake caused damage even in Edirne, Çorlu, Gallipoli and Dimetoka, which were part of the Rumelia Province of the Empire.

== Damage ==
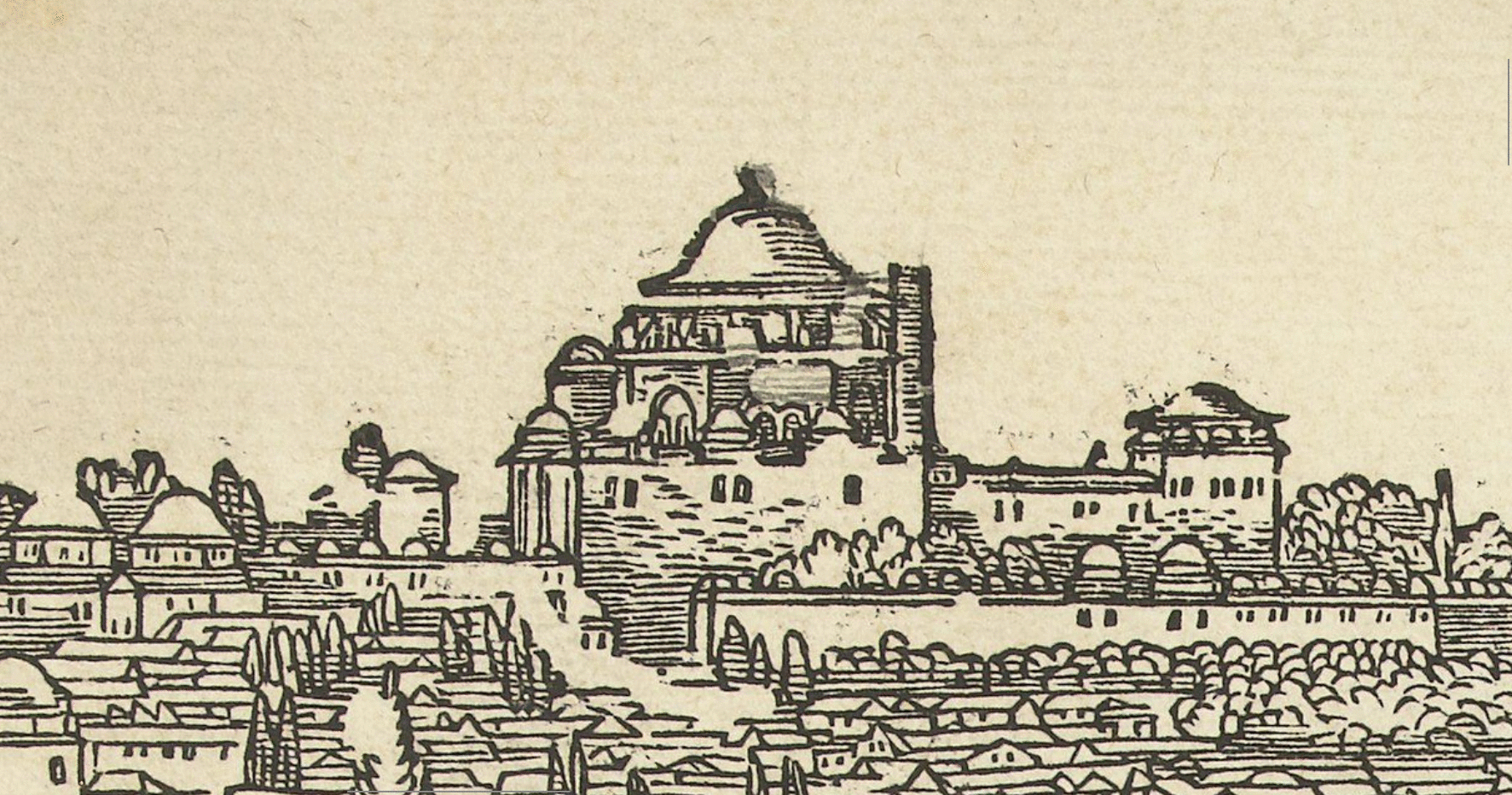
A 1529 woodcut showing damage to the Fatih Mosque

The area of significant damage (greater than VII (Very strong)) extended from Çorlu in the west to Izmit in the east. Galata and Büyükçekmece also suffered severe damage. In Constantinople 109 mosques were utterly destroyed, while most of those left standing suffered damage to their minarets. While 1,070 homes collapsed, 49 towers along the Walls of Constantinople also collapsed or were damaged. The newly built Bayezid II Mosque was badly damaged; the main dome was destroyed and a minaret collapsed. The Fatih Mosque suffered damage to its four great columns and the dome was split.

The quake also damaged the Rumeli Fortress, Anadolu Fortress, the Yoros Castle in Anadolu Kavağı, and the Maiden's Tower. The Aqueduct of Valens, located near Şehzadebaşı and supplying water to the city, was affected; the part of the aqueduct near the Şehzade Mosque was damaged. The Grand Mosque of Hagia Sophia survived almost unscathed, although a minaret collapsed. Inside the mosque, the plaster that had been used to cover up the Byzantine mosaics inside the dome fell off, revealing the Christian images. Damage occurred to the Hadım Ali Pasha Mosque, and six columns and the Obelisk of Theodosius in the Hippodrome collapsed.

The number of dead and injured is hard to estimate, with different sources giving accounts varying from 1,000 to 13,000. It is believed that some members of the Ottoman dynasty died in this earthquake. Aftershocks continued for 45 days after the earthquake, and people were unable to return to their homes for two months.

== Aftermath ==
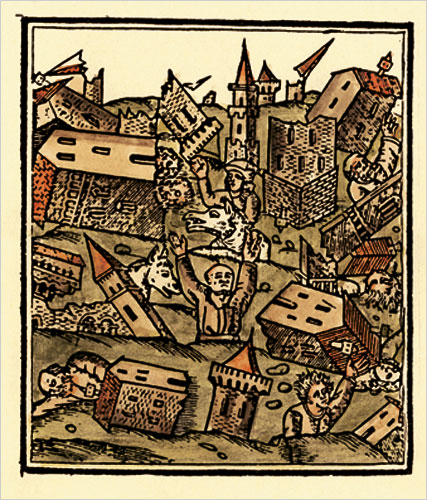
Woodcut depicting the effects of the 1509 earthquake

The sultan's residence, Topkapı Palace, was not damaged. However, Bayezid II's bedroom collapsed at the tremor, with the sultan only saved by the fact he had left his chambers a few hours earlier to get up for prayer. After staying for ten days in a tent set up in the palace garden, Bayezid II went to stay in the former capital of Edirne.

The Ottoman Imperial Council (Divan-ı Hümayun) convened after the quake and made decisions to deal with the effects of the disaster. Constantinople had to be reconstructed and an additional tax of 22 akçe would be taken from each household for the task, it was decided. With the decree issued by the sultan after the earthquake, a ban was placed on construction on filled ground and it was ordered that all buildings to be built in the capital be made of wood-frame material. Afterward, an empire-wide initiative was launched to reconstruct the city. Tens of thousands of workers, stonemasons, and carpenters were brought to Istanbul from both Anatolia and Rumelia. Beginning on 29 March 1510, construction work in the city was done hastily and completed on 1 June 1510.

== Interpretations and prophecies ==
Due to the endless aftershocks and the destruction and loss caused by the earthquake, Ottoman historians and the people described the disaster as Minor Judgment Day (Kıyamet-i Suğra). This phrase comes from an Islamic eschatological tradition that associates earthquakes with the apocalypse, referencing the Surah Al-Zalzala, the 99th chapter of the Quran, which tells of the arrival of the Last Judgment with a terrible earthquake.

The earthquake was allegedly predicted by an unnamed Greek monk from Saint Catherine's Monastery in Sinai while present in the sultan's court. European interpretations at the time viewed the earthquake as a sort of punishment, a punishment from God set upon the Turks for taking up arms against European Christians. Similarly, Sultan Bayezid II saw it as a punishment from God; however, he attributed the punishment to the wrongdoings of his ministers. It has been suggested that the French astrologer and seer Nostradamus, who was alive at the time of the earthquake, may have referred to the 1509 earthquake in the stanza number II.52 of his book containing his prophecies.

== See also ==
- List of earthquakes in Turkey
- List of historical earthquakes
