= List of earthquakes in 1957 =

Earthquakes in 1957
Approximate epicenters of the earthquakes in 1957
- 4.0–5.9 magnitude
- 6.0–6.9 magnitude
- 7.0–7.9 magnitude
- 8.0+ magnitude
- Strongest: United States, Andreanof Islands, Alaska (Magnitude 8.6) March 9
- Deadliest: Iran, Hamadan province (Magnitude 6.5) December 13, 1,200 deaths
- Total fatalities: 2,595

Number by magnitude
- 9.0+: 0
- 8.0–8.9: 2
- 7.0–7.9: 22
- 6.0–6.9: 128
- 5.0–5.9: 4

This is a list of earthquakes in 1957. Only magnitude 6.0 or greater earthquakes appear on the list. Lower magnitude events are included if they have caused death, injury or damage. Events which occurred in remote areas will be excluded from the list as they wouldn't have generated significant media interest. All dates are listed according to UTC time. The very active year started its major activity with a magnitude 8.6 earthquake in Alaska in March. This event was one of the largest on record in the United States and was followed by an energetic aftershock sequence which resulted in 6 aftershocks measuring greater than magnitude 7.0. Mongolia was affected by the strong 1957 Mongolia earthquake. Turkey and especially Iran had several earthquakes with high death tolls.

== Overall ==
=== By death toll ===
Rank	Death toll	Magnitude	Location	MMI	Depth (km)	Date
1	1,200	6.5	Iran, Hamadan province	VII (Very strong)	15.0	December 13
2	1,100	6.6	Iran, Mazandaran province	IX (Violent)	15.0	July 2
3	101	5.6	Iran, Fars province	VI (Strong)	25.0	September 5
4	65	7.6	Mexico, Guerrero	VII (Very strong)	37.8	July 28
5	52	7.1	Turkey, Duzce Province	IX (Violent)	25.0	May 26
6	30	8.1	Mongolia, Bayankhongor Province	XII (Extreme)	30.0	December 4
7	18	7.3	Turkey, off the coast of Mugla Province	X (Extreme)	35.0	April 25
8	13	5.5	Tunisia, Kef Governorate	VII (Very strong)	15.0	February 20
9	11	6.9	Taiwan, Hualien City	VI (Strong)	55.0	February 23

- Note: At least 10 casualties

=== By magnitude ===
Rank	Magnitude	Death toll	Location	MMI	Depth (km)	Date
1	8.6	2	United States, Andreanof Islands, Alaska	VIII (Severe)	25.0	March 9
2	8.1	30	Mongolia, Bayankhongor Province	XII (Extreme)	30.0	December 4
3	7.8	0	United Kingdom, Santa Cruz Islands, Solomon Islands	VII (Very strong)	123.6	December 17
4	7.7	0	Bolivia, Potosi Department	VI (Strong)	232.5	November 29
= 5	7.6	65	Mexico, Guerrero	VII (Very strong)	37.8	July 28
= 5	7.6	0	Soviet Union, eastern Kamchatka, Russia	VII (Very strong)	147.8	October 27
= 6	7.4	0	Soviet Union, Zabaykalsky Krai, Russia	X (Extreme)	25.0	June 27
= 6	7.4	0	United Kingdom, Fiji	( )	586.6	September 28
7	7.3	18	Turkey, off the coast of Mugla Province	X (Extreme)	35.0	April 25
= 8	7.2	0	United States, Andreanof Islands, Alaska	( )	25.0	March 16
= 8	7.2	0	Philippines, southeast of Mindanao	V (Moderate)	35.0	September 24
= 8	7.2	0	Sea of Okhotsk	( )	355.9	November 17
= 9	7.1	0	United States, Fox Islands (Alaska)	( )	35.0	March 11
= 9	7.1	0	United States, Andreanof Islands, Alaska	( )	20.0	March 12
= 9	7.1	0	United States, Andreanof Islands, Alaska	( )	25.0	March 14
= 9	7.1	0	United States, Fox Islands (Alaska)	VI (Strong)	46.6	March 22
= 9	7.1	0	Indonesia, Banda Sea	( )	127.2	March 23
= 9	7.1	0	Tonga	( )	20.0	April 14
= 9	7.1	0	Turkey, off the coast of Mugla Province	VII (Very strong)	35.0	April 24
= 9	7.1	52	Turkey, Duzce Province	IX (Violent)	25.0	May 26
= 9	7.1	0	Indonesia, eastern Yapen	VII (Very strong)	59.1	June 22
= 10	7.0	0	United States, Andreanof Islands, Alaska	( )	25.0	March 11
= 10	7.0	0	United States, south of Kodiak Island, Alaska	( )	15.0	April 10
= 10	7.0	0	New Zealand, Kermadec Islands	( )	204.1	July 14

- Note: At least 7.0 magnitude

== Notable events ==
=== January ===
January
- Strongest: 6.9 M_{w} China
- Total fatalities: 0

Number by magnitude
- 8.0–8.9: 0
- 7.0–7.9: 0
- 6.0–6.9: 13

Date	Country and location	M_{w}	Depth (km)	MMI	Notes	Casualties	
Date	Country and location	M_{w}	Depth (km)	MMI	Notes	Dead	Injured
2	United States, Fox Islands (Alaska)	6.4	20.0	I	Series of events that struck the Fox Islands began with this event.		
2	United States, Fox Islands (Alaska)	6.7	20.0	I			
2	United States, Fox Islands (Alaska)	6.6	20.0	I			
2	United States, Fox Islands (Alaska)	6.0		I	Unknown depth.		
2	United States, Fox Islands (Alaska)	6.7	20.0	I			
2	United States, Fox Islands (Alaska)	6.5	20.0	I			
2	United States, Fox Islands (Alaska)	6.1	25.0	I			
3	United States, Fox Islands (Alaska)	6.4	25.0	I			
3	China, Heilongjiang	6.9	581.0	III			
17	Japan, south of Honshu	6.5	357.6				
19	United Kingdom, Fiji	6.5	622.9				
24	Peru, off the coast of central	6.2	20.0				
25	United States, Andreanof Islands, Alaska	6.0	45.0	I			

=== February ===
February
- Strongest: 6.9 M_{w} Taiwan
- Deadliest: 5.5 M_{w} Tunisia; 13 deaths
- Total fatalities: 24

Number by magnitude
- 8.0–8.9: 0
- 7.0–7.9: 0
- 6.0–6.9: 11
- 5.0–5.9: 1

Date	Country and location	M_{w}	Depth (km)	MMI	Notes	Casualties	
Date	Country and location	M_{w}	Depth (km)	MMI	Notes	Dead	Injured
3	Soviet Union, eastern Kamchatka	6.4	15.0	VI			
6	Mongolia, Selenge Province	6.4	10.0	VII			
10	Philippines, northeast of Mindanao	6.6	20.0	VI	Start of a series.		
10	Philippines, northeast of Mindanao	6.7	20.0	VI			
11	Philippines, northeast of Mindanao	6.6	20.0	VI			
11	Philippines, northeast of Mindanao	6.2	15.0	V			
13	Philippines, northeast of Mindanao	6.2	15.0	V			
18	Peru, off the coast of central	6.6	77.0				
19	Greece, south of	6.0	15.0				
20	Tunisia, Kef Governorate	5.5	15.0	VII	13 people were killed and 96 were injured. Some damage was caused.	13	96
21	United States, Fox Islands (Alaska)	6.8	104.1				
23	Taiwan, Hualien City	6.9	55.0	VI	11 deaths were caused and many people were injured. Some damage was caused.	11	

=== March ===
March
- Strongest: 8.6 M_{w} United States
- Deadliest: 0.0 2 events caused 2 deaths.
- Total fatalities: 5

Number by magnitude
- 8.0–8.9: 1
- 7.0–7.9: 7
- 6.0–6.9: 18
- 5.0–5.9: 1

Date	Country and location	M_{w}	Depth (km)	MMI	Notes	Casualties	
Date	Country and location	M_{w}	Depth (km)	MMI	Notes	Dead	Injured
2	United Kingdom, Westmoreland Parish, Jamaica	6.2	20.0	VII			
2	Australia, East New Britain Province, Papua and New Guinea	6.1	23.2	VI			
8	Greece, Thessaly	6.5	10.0	rowspan="2"| Doublet earthquake.			
8	Greece, Thessaly	6.4	10.0	X	2	101+	
8	Greece, Thessaly	6.0	15.0	VII	Aftershock.		
9	United States, Andreanof Islands, Alaska	8.6	25.0	VIII	The 1957 Andreanof Islands earthquake was one of the largest events of the 20th Century. A robust aftershock sequence followed and to prevent cluttering only magnitude 6.5+ events will be listed. The earthquake caused fairly minor damage. A tsunami caused widespread destruction on Hawaii with $5 million worth of damage being reported. 2 people were killed and 1 person was hurt.	2	1
9	United States, Fox Islands (Alaska)	6.9	25.0	I	Aftershock.		
10	United States, Andreanof Islands, Alaska	6.6	25.0	I	Aftershock.		
10	United States, Andreanof Islands, Alaska	6.6	33.0	I	Aftershock.		
10	United States, Andreanof Islands, Alaska	6.5	25.0	I	Aftershock.		
11	United States, Andreanof Islands, Alaska	6.8	15.0	I	Aftershock.		
11	United States, Fox Islands (Alaska)	7.1	35.0	I	Aftershock.		
11	Indonesia, off the west coast of northern Sumatra	6.2	35.0	VI			
11	United States, Andreanof Islands, Alaska	7.0	25.0	I	Aftershock.		
11	United States, Andreanof Islands, Alaska	6.5	35.0	I	Aftershock.		
12	United States, Andreanof Islands, Alaska	6.5	25.0	I	Aftershock.		
12	United States, Andreanof Islands, Alaska	7.1	20.0	I	Aftershock. Felt on Adak and Umnak Islands.		
13	United States, Andreanof Islands, Alaska	6.6	25.0	I	Aftershock.		
13	New Zealand, Manawatu-Whanganui, North Island	6.5	270.0				
14	United States, Andreanof Islands, Alaska	7.1	25.0	I	Aftershock. Felt on Adak Island.		
16	United States, Andreanof Islands, Alaska	7.2	25.0	I	Aftershock. Felt on Adak Island.		
19	United States, Andreanof Islands, Alaska	6.8	15.0	I	Aftershock.		
21	Mexico, off the coast of Chiapas	6.0	25.0				
22	United States, Fox Islands (Alaska)	7.1	46.6	VI			
22	United States, San Francisco, California	5.3	0.0	VII	1 person was killed and 40 were injured in the 1957 San Francisco earthquake. Some damage was caused with costs of $1 million (1957 rate).	1	40
23	Indonesia, Banda Sea	7.1	127.2				
29	United States, Fox Islands (Alaska)	6.8	25.0	VI	Aftershock.		

=== April ===
April
- Strongest: 7.3 M_{w} Turkey
- Deadliest: 7.3 M_{w} Turkey; 18 deaths
- Total fatalities: 18

Number by magnitude
- 8.0–8.9: 0
- 7.0–7.9: 3
- 6.0–6.9: 17

Date	Country and location	M_{w}	Depth (km)	MMI	Notes	Casualties	
Date	Country and location	M_{w}	Depth (km)	MMI	Notes	Dead	Injured
4	United States, Alaska Peninsula	6.0	100.3	IV			
5	United Kingdom, south of Fiji	6.5	92.1				
7	Indonesia, off the north coast of Papua (province)	6.3	15.0	V			
8	Panama, Chiriqui Province	6.0	20.0	VI			
9	Japan, south of Honshu	6.8	453.3				
10	Mexico, off the coast of Oaxaca	6.1	15.0				
10	United States, south of Kodiak Island, Alaska	6.7	15.0	I			
13	Philippines, south of Mindanao	6.0	75.0				
13	South Africa, Orange Free State	6.4	0.0		Unknown depth.		
14	China, western Xizang Province	6.4	15.0	VII			
14	Tonga	7.1	20.0				
16	Indonesia, Java Sea	6.9	596.3				
19	United States, Fox Islands (Alaska)	6.5	14.5	I	Aftershock of March 9 event.		
20	Australia, off the east coast of mainland Papua and New Guinea	6.2	35.0	VI			
21	Colombia, Boyaca Department	6.6	25.0	VII			
22	China, western Xizang Province	6.0	15.0	VII	Aftershock of April 14 event.		
24	Turkey, off the coast of Mugla Province	7.1	35.0	rowspan="2"| 1957 Fethiye earthquakes. Doublet earthquake. 18 people were killed and 92 were injured. 3,000 homes were destroyed and 5,000 were damaged.			
25	Turkey, off the coast of Mugla Province	7.3	35.0	X	18	92	
26	Turkey, off the coast of Mugla Province	6.0	25.0	V			
28	Philippines, east of Mindanao	6.2	50.0	V			

=== May ===
May
- Strongest: 7.1 M_{w} Turkey
- Deadliest: 7.1 M_{w} Turkey; 52 deaths
- Total fatalities: 52

Number by magnitude
- 8.0–8.9: 0
- 7.0–7.9: 1
- 6.0–6.9: 5

Date	Country and location	M_{w}	Depth (km)	MMI	Notes	Casualties	
Date	Country and location	M_{w}	Depth (km)	MMI	Notes	Dead	Injured
4	Indonesia, Papua (province)	6.1	20.0	VII			
24	Colombia, Valle del Cauca Department	6.1	52.3	VI			
26	Turkey, Duzce Province	7.1	25.0	IX	The 1957 Abant earthquake left 52 people dead and caused major damage.	52	
26	Turkey, Sakarya Province	6.0	15.0	VII	Aftershock.		
30	Tonga	6.1	25.0				
31	Argentina, Santiago del Estero Province	6.4	572.9				

=== June ===
June
- Strongest: 7.4 M_{w} Soviet Union
- Total fatalities: 0

Number by magnitude
- 8.0–8.9: 0
- 7.0–7.9: 2
- 6.0–6.9: 6
- 5.0–5.9: 1

Date	Country and location	M_{w}	Depth (km)	MMI	Notes	Casualties	
Date	Country and location	M_{w}	Depth (km)	MMI	Notes	Dead	Injured
4	United Kingdom, Fiji	6.4	589.2				
10	Indonesia, Sumbawa	6.5	132.8				
10	United States, west of Guam	6.8	133.8				
10	China, Shanxi	5.0	0.0	VI	A few homes were destroyed.		
11	New Zealand, Kermadec Islands	6.6	62.5				
11	Philippines, off the west coast of Luzon	6.5	45.0	VI			
13	United States, Andreanof Islands, Alaska	6.8	19.1	I			
22	Indonesia, eastern Yapen	7.1	59.1	VII	Major damage was caused.		
27	Soviet Union, Zabaykalsky Krai, Russia	7.4	25.0	X	Some damage was caused.		

=== July ===
July
- Strongest: 7.6 M_{w} Mexico
- Total fatalities: 1,165

Number by magnitude
- 8.0–8.9: 0
- 7.0–7.9: 2
- 6.0–6.9: 14

Date	Country and location	M_{w}	Depth (km)	MMI	Notes	Casualties	
Date	Country and location	M_{w}	Depth (km)	MMI	Notes	Dead	Injured
1	India, Manipur	6.2	65.0	VI			
2	Iran, Mazandaran province	6.6	15.0	IX	During the 1957 Sangchal earthquake, 1,100 people were killed and major damage was reported.	1,100	
4	Indonesia, off the west coast of southern Sumatra	6.0	65.0				
7	Australia, southern Bougainville Island, Papua and New Guinea	6.1	40.0	V			
8	Guatemala, Suchitepequez Department	6.0	115.0				
9	Indonesia, Sunda Strait	6.0	39.9	IV			
10	Panama, south of	6.3	20.0				
14	New Zealand, Kermadec Islands	7.0	204.1				
14	New Zealand, Kermadec Islands	6.5	50.0		Aftershock.		
14	Tonga	6.0	25.0				
17	United Kingdom, Santa Cruz Islands, Solomon Islands	6.4	119.8				
19	Taiwan, off the east coast of	6.1	105.7				
24	Chile, Coquimbo Region	6.0	50.0	VI			
25	New Hebrides, Vanuatu	6.1	25.0				
28	Mexico, Guerrero	7.6	37.8	VII	65 people were killed in the 1957 Guerrero earthquake. Many homes were destroyed. Damage costs were at least $25 million (1957 rate).	65	
29	Chile, off the coast of Antofagasta Region	6.5	15.0	VI			

=== August ===
August
- Strongest: 6.5 M_{w} 5 events
- Total fatalities: 0

Number by magnitude
- 8.0–8.9: 0
- 7.0–7.9: 0
- 6.0–6.9: 14

Date	Country and location	M_{w}	Depth (km)	MMI	Notes	Casualties	
Date	Country and location	M_{w}	Depth (km)	MMI	Notes	Dead	Injured
4	Australia, off the north coast of Papua and New Guinea	6.1	15.0	V			
9	Indonesia, off the north coast of Papua (province)	6.2	15.0	VI			
11	New Hebrides, Vanuatu	6.1	20.0				
18	Philippines, east of Masbate Island	6.5	20.0	VI			
18	Mexico, off the coast of Guerrero	6.0	20.0	VI	Aftershock of July event.		
18	Soviet Union, Kuril Islands, Russia	6.5	57.4	VI			
19	United States, Fox Islands (Alaska)	6.5	15.0				
20	United Kingdom, Solomon Islands	6.1	25.0	rowspan="2"| Doublet earthquake.			
20	United Kingdom, Solomon Islands	6.1	25.0	VI			
21	Soviet Union, Kuril Islands, Russia	6.5	100.0				
23	Australia, off the west coast of Bougainville Island, Papua New Guinea	6.5	87.7				
23	Taiwan, off the east coast of	6.0	20.0	VI			
26	Bolivia, Santa Cruz Department (Bolivia)	6.3	15.0	VII			
26	Ecuador, off the coast of	6.3	15.0	VI			

=== September ===
September
- Strongest: 7.4 M_{w} United Kingdom

Number by magnitude
- 8.0–8.9: 0
- 7.0–7.9: 2
- 6.0–6.9: 6
- 5.0–5.9: 0

Date	Country and location	M_{w}	Depth (km)	MMI	Notes	Casualties	
Date	Country and location	M_{w}	Depth (km)	MMI	Notes	Dead	Injured
2	Afghanistan, Badakhshan Province	6.1	211.8	IV			
4	Pakistan, Balochistan, Pakistan	6.0	0.0		Unknown depth.		
5	Portugal, Manica Province, Mozambique	6.0	0.0		Unknown depth.		
12	Honduras, north of	6.1	21.0				
24	Philippines, southeast of Mindanao	7.3	35.0	V			
26	New Zealand, Cook Strait	6.0	128.0	V			
28	Japan, south of Honshu	6.8	461.4				
28	United Kingdom, Fiji	7.4	586.6				

=== October ===
October
- Strongest: 7.6 M_{w} Soviet Union
- Total fatalities: 0

Number by magnitude
- 8.0–8.9: 0
- 7.0–7.9: 1
- 6.0–6.9: 9

Date	Country and location	M_{w}	Depth (km)	MMI	Notes	Casualties	
Date	Country and location	M_{w}	Depth (km)	MMI	Notes	Dead	Injured
4	Venezuela, off the coast of Sucre (state)	6.4	23.3	VI			
6	Venezuela, off the coast of Sucre (state)	6.0	15.0	V	Aftershock.		
12	Indonesia, south of Java	6.0	50.0	IV			
19	Taiwan, Hualien County	6.8	30.0	VI			
19	Japan, northeast of Hokkaido	6.6	153.8				
24	New Hebrides, Vanuatu	6.0	20.0	VI			
24	Mexico, Gulf of California	6.2	15.0	V			
25	Soviet Union, Kuril Islands, Russia	6.4	50.1	VI			
26	Indonesia, East Kalimantan	6.1	20.0	VII			
27	Soviet Union, eastern Kamchatka, Russia	7.6	147.8	VII			

=== November ===
November
- Strongest: 7.7 M_{w} Bolivia
- Total fatalities: 0

Number by magnitude
- 8.0–8.9: 0
- 7.0–7.9: 2
- 6.0–6.9: 9

Date	Country and location	M_{w}	Depth (km)	MMI	Notes	Casualties	
Date	Country and location	M_{w}	Depth (km)	MMI	Notes	Dead	Injured
2	New Hebrides, Vanuatu	6.2	85.0	V			
10	United Kingdom, Solomon Islands	6.2	25.0	VI			
10	Australia, Morobe Province, Papua and New Guinea	6.0	20.0	VI			
10	Japan, off the south coast of Honshu	6.2	15.0	VI			
13	New Zealand, south of the Kermadec Islands	6.5	30.0				
15	Philippines, western Mindanao	6.3	80.0	VI			
15	Soviet Union, off the east coast of Kamchatka, Russia	6.1	75.0	V			
17	Sea of Okhotsk	7.2	355.9				
25	Indonesia, East Kalimantan	6.1	20.0	rowspan="2"| Doublet earthquake.			
26	Indonesia, East Kalimantan	6.0	45.0	VI			
29	Bolivia, Potosi Department	7.7	232.5	VI			

=== December ===
December
- Strongest: 8.1 M_{w} Mongolia
- Deadliest: 6.5 M_{w} Iran; 1,200 deaths
- Total fatalities: 1,230

Number by magnitude
- 8.0–8.9: 1
- 7.0–7.9: 1
- 6.0–6.9: 8

Date	Country and location	M_{w}	Depth (km)	MMI	Notes	Casualties	
Date	Country and location	M_{w}	Depth (km)	MMI	Notes	Dead	Injured
4	Mongolia, Bayankhongor Province	8.1	30.0	XII	The 1957 Mongolia earthquake left 30 people dead and some damage in the area.	30	
4	Mongolia, Ovorhangai Province	6.1	15.0	VII	Aftershock.		
10	Australia, off the west coast of Bougainville Island, Papua and New Guinea	6.6	25.0	VI			
13	Colombia, Antioquia Department	6.5	52.6				
13	Iran, Hamadan province	6.5	15.0	VII	The 1957 Farsinaj earthquake caused 1,200 deaths and heavy destruction.	1,200	
16	Canada, off the west coast of Vancouver Island	6.1	15.0				
17	Soviet Union, off the east coast of Kamchatka	6.7	26.0				
17	United Kingdom, Santa Cruz Islands, Solomon Islands	7.8	123.6	VII			
25	Venezuela, Gulf of Paria	6.1	15.0	VI			
28	Bolivia, Santa Cruz Department (Bolivia)	6.1	15.0	VII			
