= San Francisco Public Library =

Public library system in California, US

Coordinates: 37.7790°N 122.4163°W

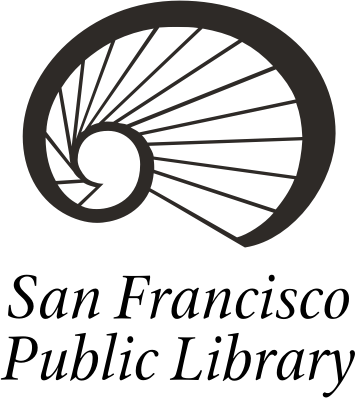

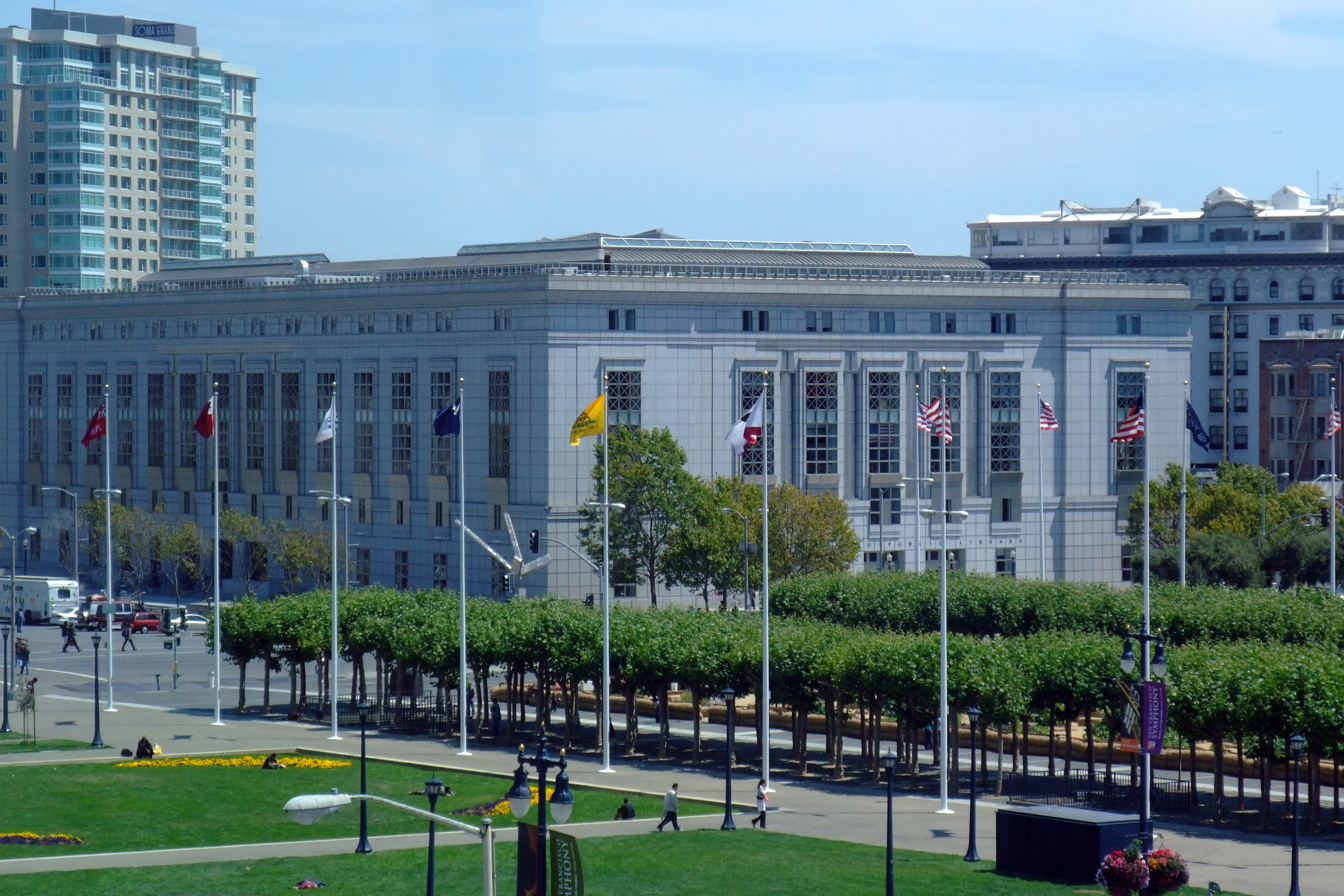
- Location: San Francisco, California, United States
- Type: Public
- Established: 1878
- Architects: PCF Architects, Cathy Simon
- Branches: 27

Collection
- Size: 3,946,841

Access and use
- Circulation: 10,971,974
- Population served: 870,887

Other information
- Budget: $126 million (FY 2017)
- Director: Michael Lambert, City Librarian
- Website: www.sfpl.org

The San Francisco Public Library is the public library system of the city and county of San Francisco in the United States. The Main Library is located at Civic Center, at 100 Larkin Street. The library system has won several awards, such as Library Journal's Library of the Year award in 2018. The library is well-funded due to the city's dedicated Library Preservation Fund that was established by a 1994 ballot measure. The Preservation Fund was renewed twice, by ballot measures in 2007 and 2022.

== History ==
In August 1877 a residents' meeting was called by state senators George H. Rogers and Andrew Smith Hallidie who advocated the creation of a free public library for San Francisco. A board of trustees for the Library was created in 1878 through the Free Library Act, signed by Governor of California William Irwin on March 18, which also created a property tax to fund the Library project. The economist Henry George served as the board's first secretary. The San Francisco Public Library (then known as the San Francisco Free Library) opened on June 7, 1879, at Pacific Hall on Bush Street at Kearny Street and hired Albert Hart as the first librarian. In 1888 the library moved to the Larkin Street wing of City Hall at Civic Center. The first three branches opened from 1888 to 1889, in the Mission, in North Beach, and in Potrero Hill. In 1889 the Library became a Federal depository by nomination of Senator George Hearst.

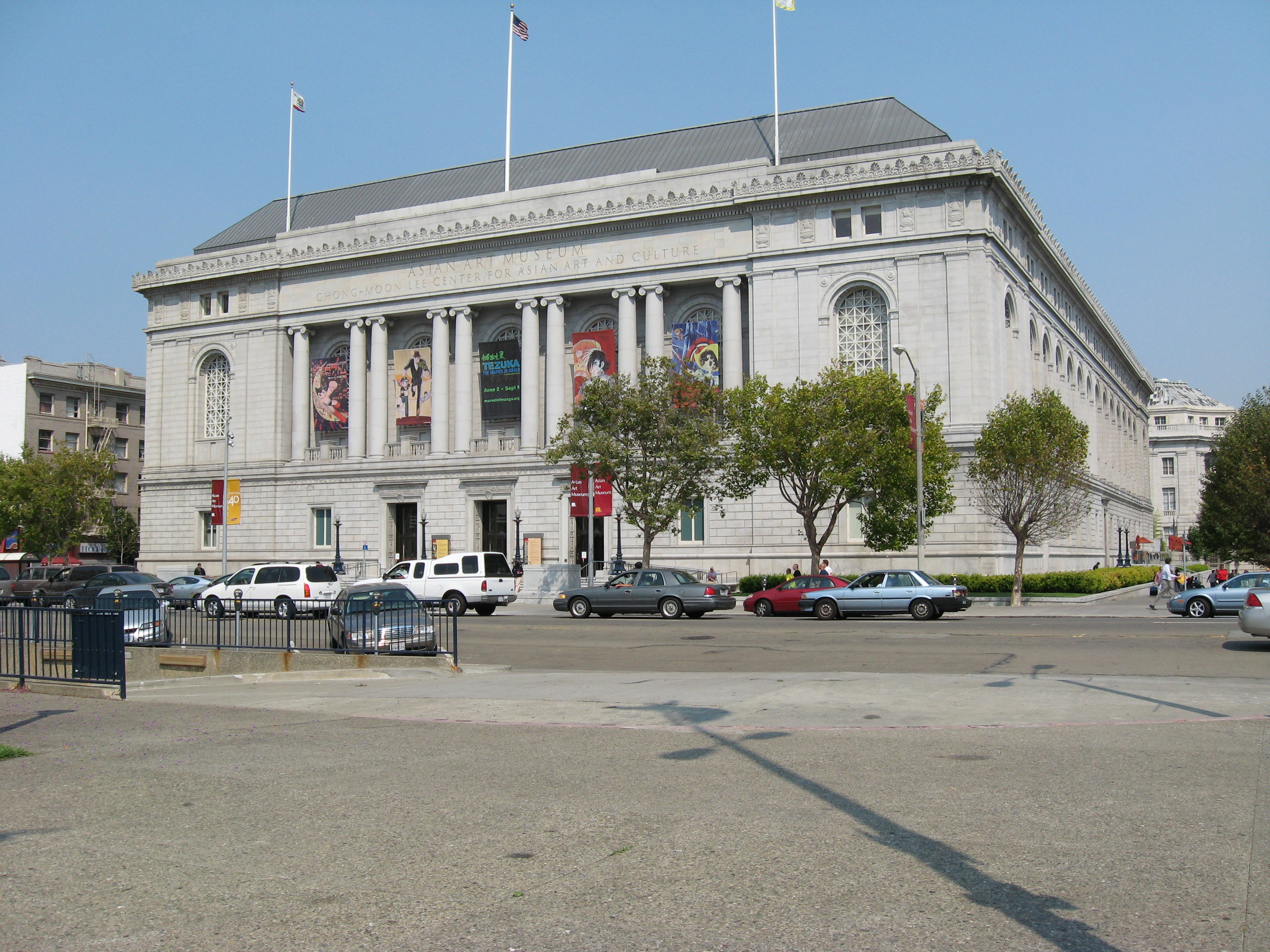
The 1916 main library building now houses the Asian Art Museum

In 1905, architect Daniel Burnham presented his plans for a new Civic Center for San Francisco, including a new library building. These plans were put on hold after the 1906 San Francisco earthquake, which destroyed about 140,000 volumes, nearly 80% of its holdings. The library moved to temporary quarters while a new building was designed and built. In 1917, the new main library building, designed by George W. Kelham, opened in the Civic Center. Ten major murals by California Tonalist Gottardo Piazzoni were installed in 1931–1932; four more were completed in 1945 but left uninstalled until the 1970s.

=== New Main Library ===
In 1986, a task force was set up to complete the design of the Civic Center, including the use of Marshall Square, next to the main library at the time, for a new main library. The building was completed in 1995 and opened a year later on April 18, 1996. The old main library, which was damaged in the 1989 Loma Prieta earthquake, was rebuilt as the new Asian Art Museum. The Piazzoni murals moved to the de Young Museum in 1999.

=== History from the 1990s to the present ===
In 2018, the Library Journal awarded it the Library of the Year award.

In March 2019, the San Francisco Public Library Commission voted to remove standing library fines and completely wipe out future fines because the fines serve as an impediment to access for community patrons who would otherwise use and visit one of San Francisco's twenty-seven public libraries. The vote needed to be approved by a Board of Supervisors, and the mayor of San Francisco, Mayor London Breed was supportive of this action. It was approved, and September 15, 2019, was the first day all fines were cleared.

Under the "Browse and Bounce” program, the public library began reopening its doors to visitors on May 3, 2021, for the first time since its shutdown in March 2020 due to the stay-at-home order issued during the COVID-19 pandemic in the United States. The first floor of the Main Branch was the first to open with adjusted guidelines, such as an hour time limit and plexiglass between computers.

== Branch libraries ==
In addition to the Main Library, the San Francisco Public Library has 27 branch libraries.

- Anza
- Bayview
- Bernal Heights
- Chinatown
- Eureka Valley
- Excelsior
- Glen Park
- Golden Gate Valley
- Ingleside
- Marina
- Merced
- Mission
- Mission Bay
- Noe Valley
- North Beach
- Ocean View
- Ortega
- Park
- Parkside
- Portola
- Potrero
- Presidio
- Richmond
- Sunset
- Visitacion Valley
- West Portal
- Western Addition

=== Anza ===
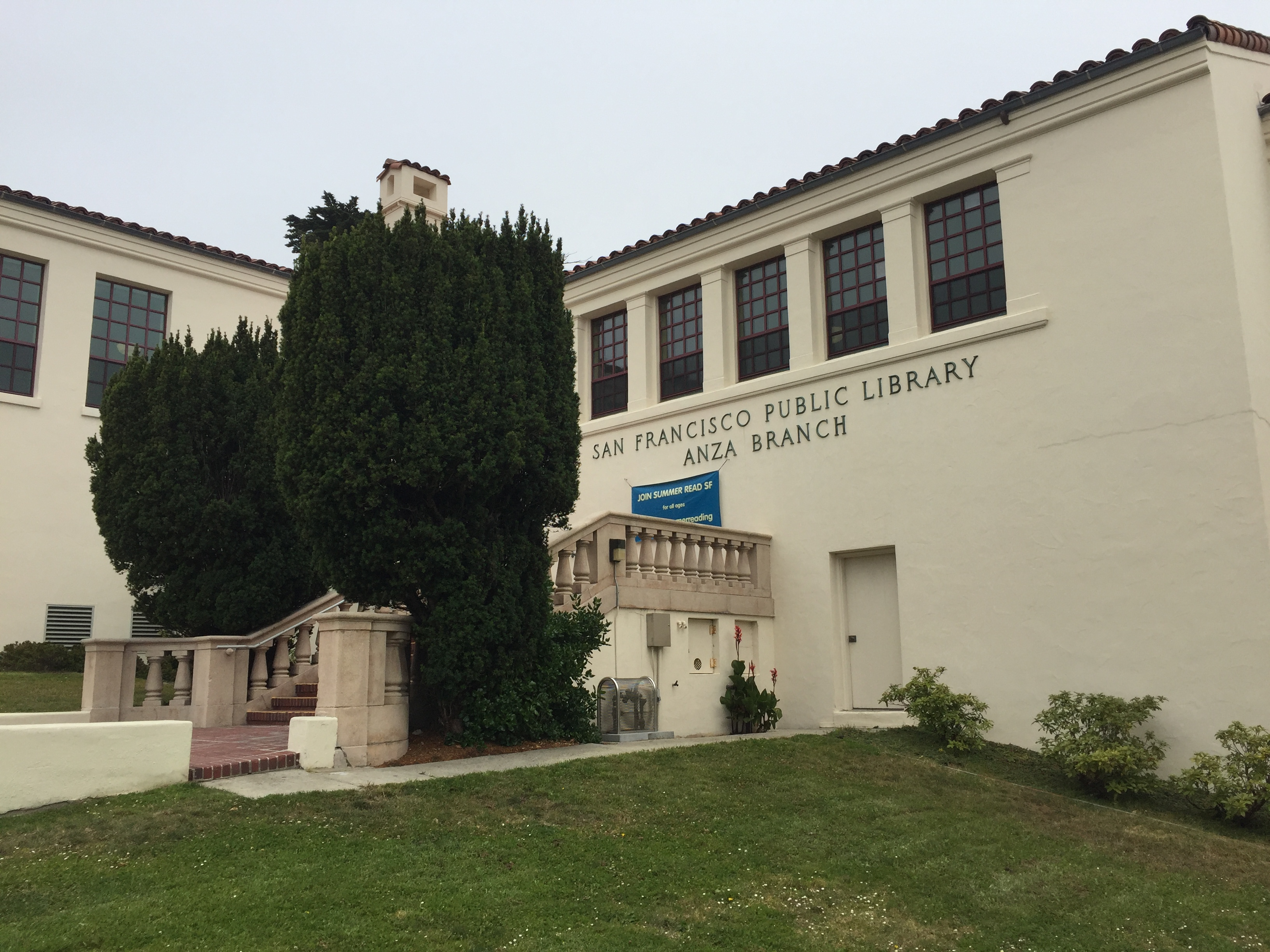
Anza Branch (2016)

In 1930, San Francisco voters approved a charter amendment to increase taxes to fund the construction of the Anza Branch Library. Using the site of the old Lafayette School, architect John W. Reid Jr. designed and landscaped the new branch building. The new branch was dedicated on April 10, 1932, with 11,823 new books on the shelves. Total cost for the building and its furnishings was $57,117.29. Anza Branch Library was the 17th branch established in the San Francisco Public Library system. The branch closed temporarily for renovation in May 2009. The Anza Branch reopened on Saturday June 18, 2011.

=== Bayview ===
The new Bayview Library opened February 23, 2013. The original Bayview/Anna E. Waden Branch Library was opened as a storefront facility in 1927. It was the 13th branch in the San Francisco Public Library system, replacing a "library station" that had been established in 1921. In 1969, a red brick building was built on the corner of the 3rd Street and Revere Avenue in the Bayview/Hunters Point district.

=== Bernal Heights ===
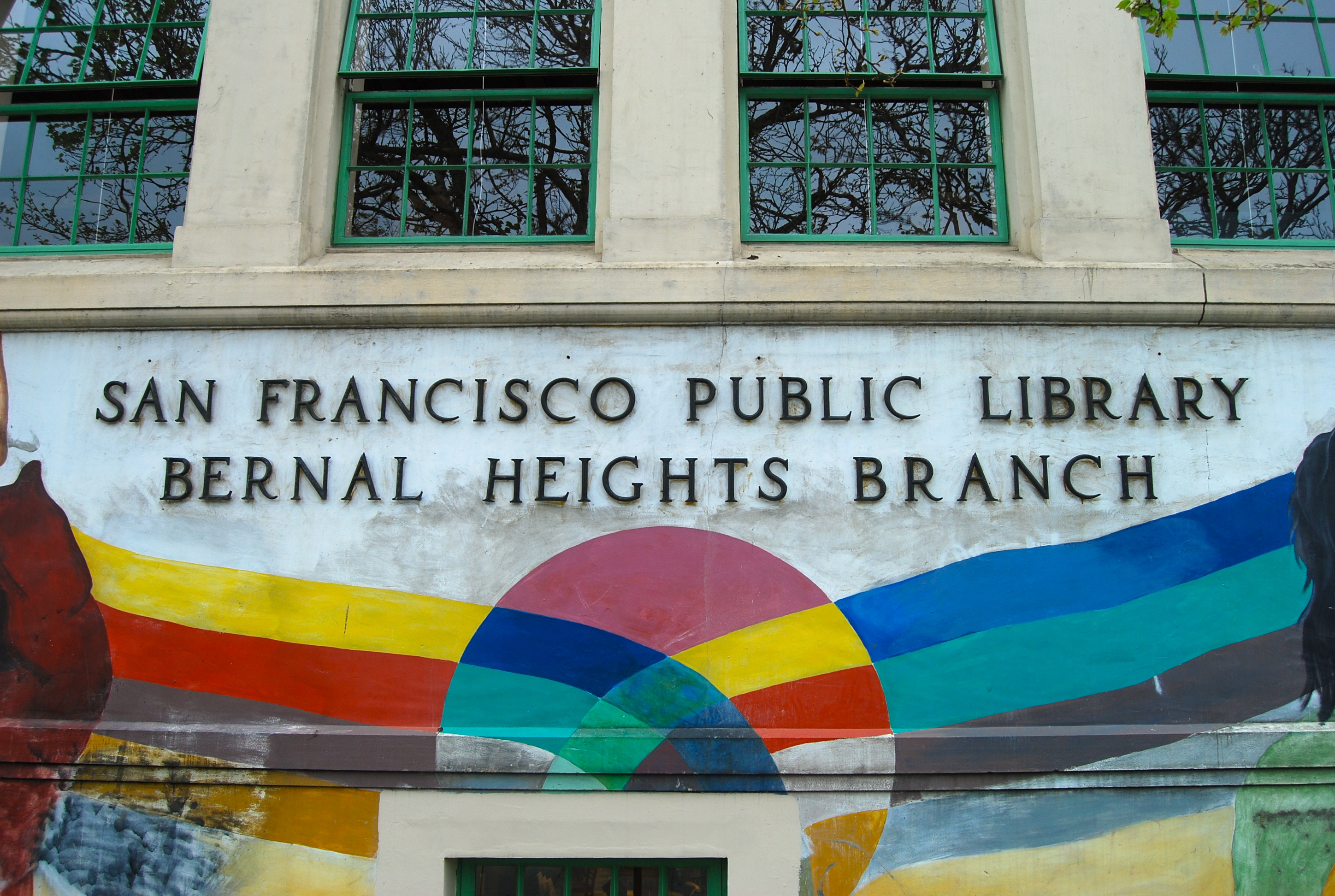
Bernal Heights Branch (2010)

The Bernal Heights Renovation was completed on January 30, 2010. A “library deposit station” was established in 1920 at 303 Cortland Avenue. As the neighborhood and library grew, it was moved, in 1936, to 324 Cortland. When that proved inadequate the neighbors lobbied for a new building. The one floor branch library at 500 Cortland, was the 21st in the system and built on the site of the original Bernal School at a cost of $94,600. It was designed by Frederick H. Meyer, one of the most prolific and versatile architects in San Francisco at the turn of the 20th century, funded by the Work Projects Administration and dedicated on October 21, 1940.

=== Chinatown ===
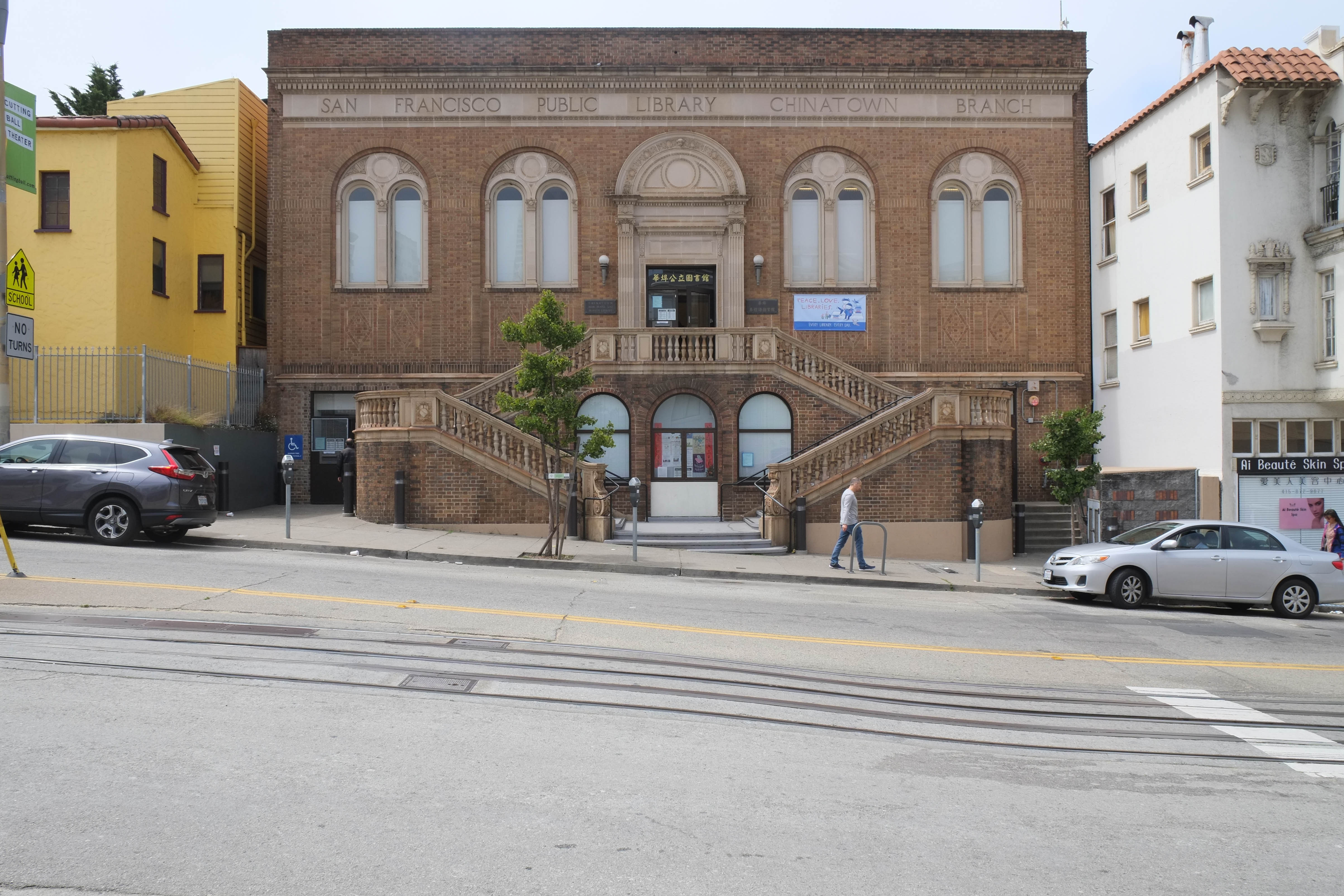
Chinatown Branch (2017)

Chinatown Branch Library, built in 1921 by architect G. Albert Lansburgh is a Carnegie library originally named the North Beach Branch. It is the third branch in the system. Located in Chinatown on Powell Street between Washington and Jackson, the name was changed in 1958 to more accurately reflect the community served. In 1972, the Chinese language, and the Chinese American Interest collections were started in response to the needs and interests of the Chinatown community. In 1991, public and private funds were obtained for a major renovation and expansion of the Chinatown Branch Library. The branch was seismically retrofitted and expanded to twice its original size with a community meeting room and story-room available to use for programs and special events. The Grand Reopening of the Chinatown Branch Library was held on June 15, 1996.

=== Eureka Valley/Harvey Milk Memorial ===
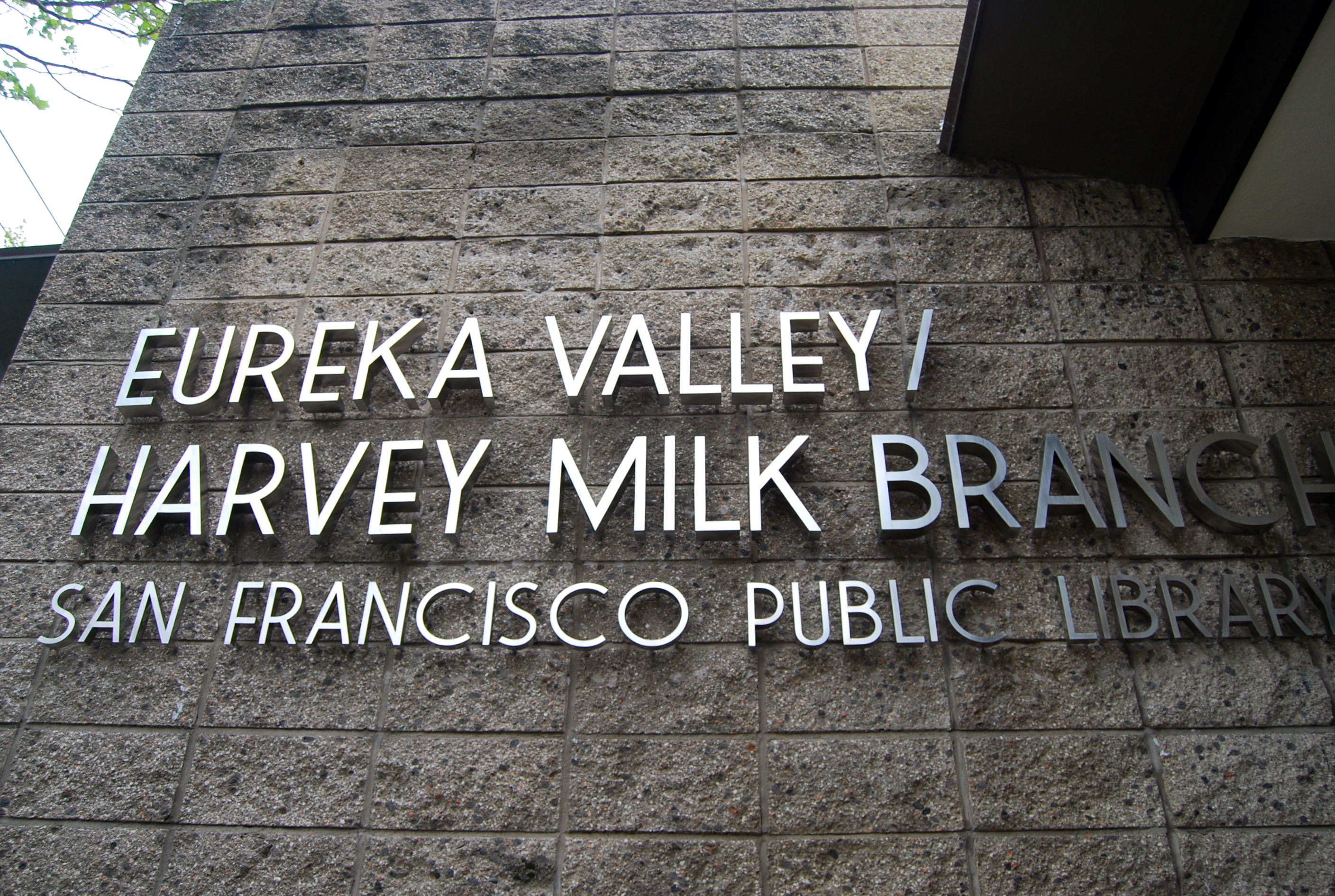
Eureka Valley/Harvey Milk Branch (2010)

The Eureka Valley Renovation was completed on October 24, 2009. The first branch building was the second branch in the system and opened on January 2, 1902. It was named the McCreery Branch in honor of Andrew McCreery who donated the land and paid for construction. It was damaged in the Daly City earthquake of 1957 and demolished. The site was used to construct a new building designed by Appleton and Wolford at a cost of $192,335 and opened on December 20, 1961. It was named the Eureka Valley Branch. In 1981 the Library Commission officially changed the name of the branch to Eureka Valley/Harvey Milk Memorial Branch Library to honor Harvey Milk, the first openly gay man to be elected to public office in California. Harvey Milk served as a member of the San Francisco Board of Supervisors until he was assassinated along with Mayor George Moscone on November 27, 1978. In 2006 the City honored José Sarria, the first openly gay man to run for Supervisor (in 1961) by renaming the section of 16th Street adjacent to the branch as José Sarria Court. José Sarria is best known for founding the Imperial Court System, one of the cornerstones of the GLBT community.

=== Excelsior ===
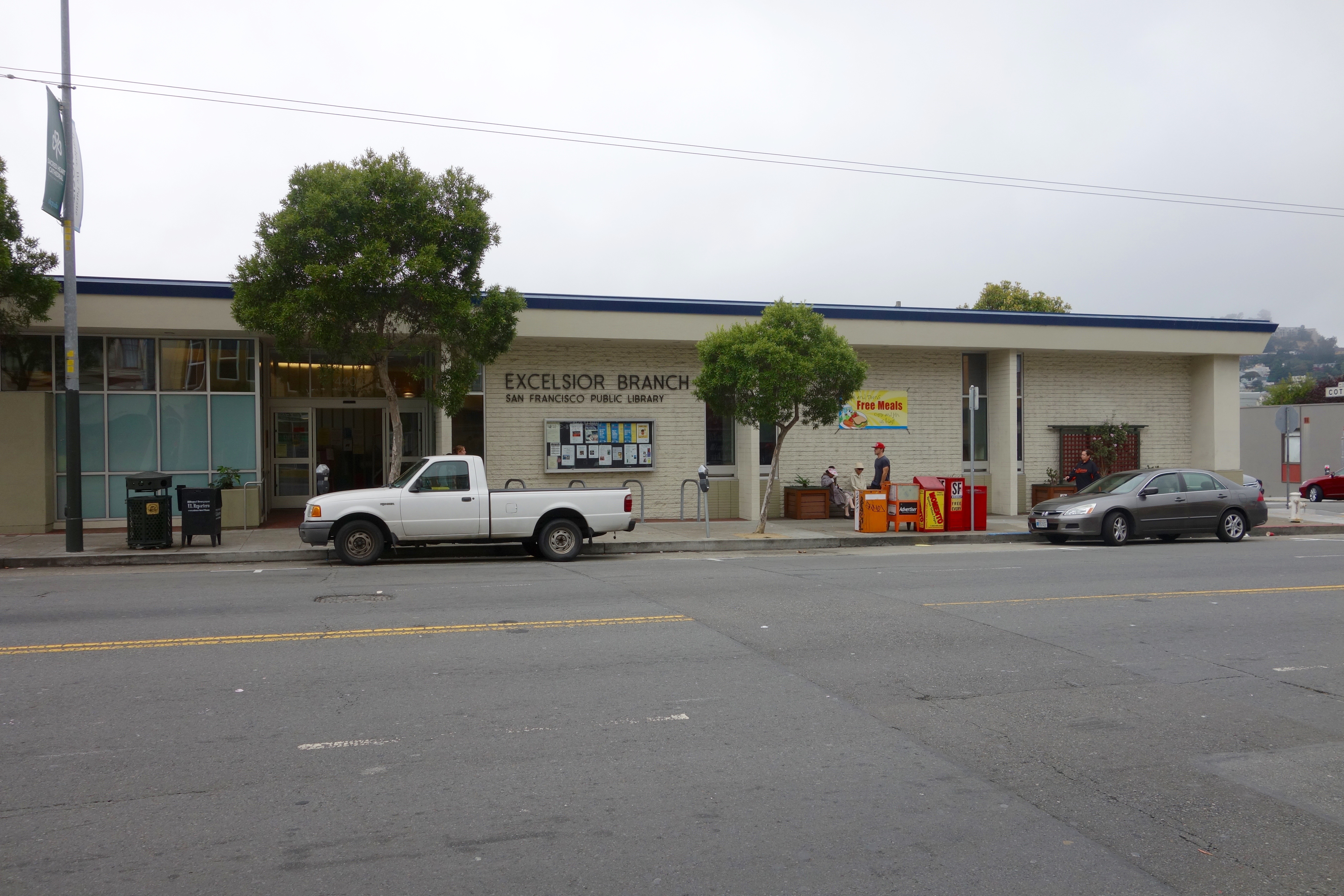
Excelsior Branch (2016)

The Excelsior Branch Library was the 10th branch established in the San Francisco Public Library system. Initially a "library station", the first branch library was installed in rental quarters at 7 Bauer Street. In 1925 the branch was located on Ocean Avenue and later at 4465 Mission Street. The current building at 4400 Mission Street was opened to the public October 1, 1967. The branch was designed by architects Appleton and Wolfard and built for $248,000. The Excelsior Branch was the first to be renovated under the Branch Library Improvement Program and reopened on July 8, 2005.

=== Glen Park ===
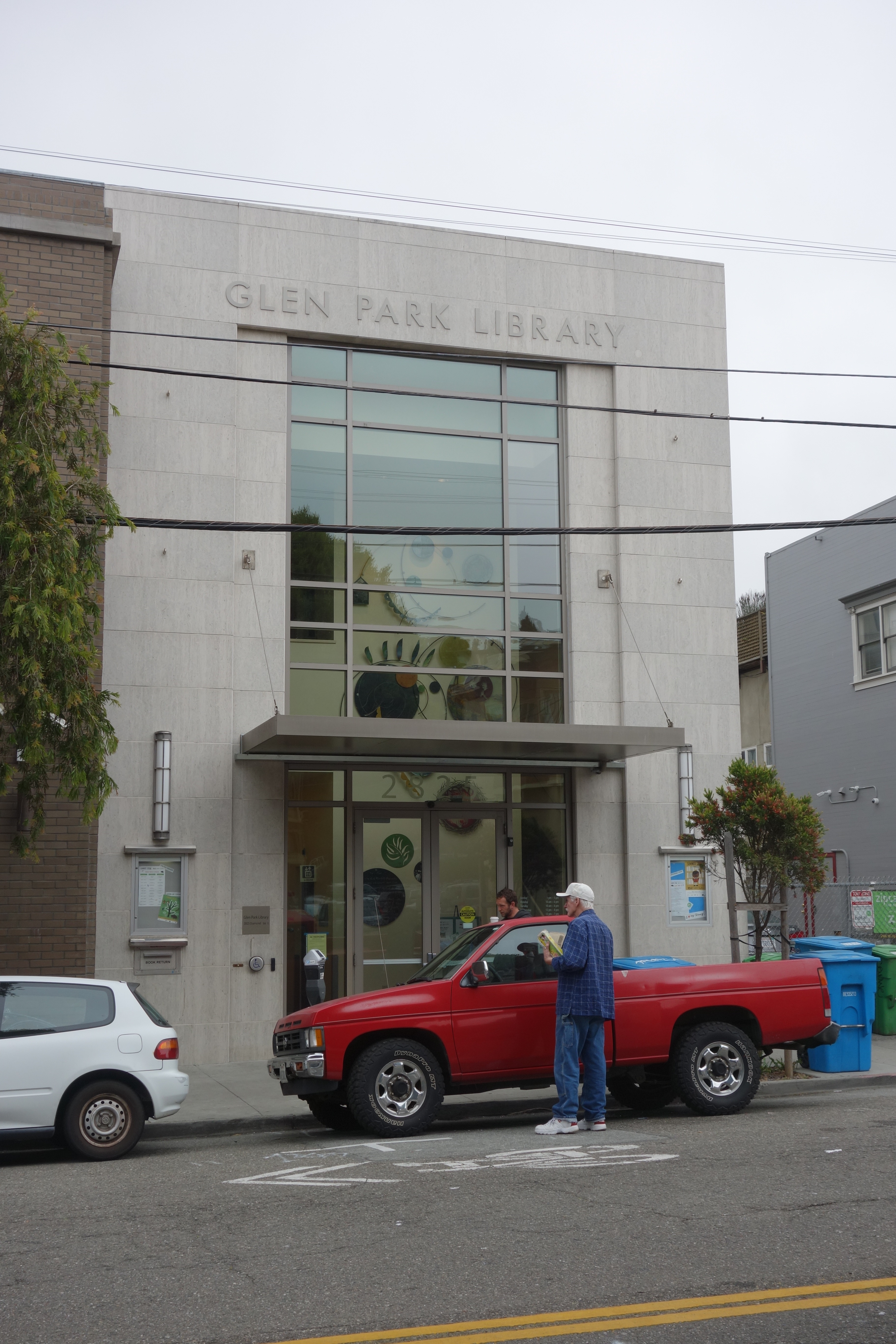
Glen Park Branch (2016)

Glen Park Branch Library first opened in January 1927, at 700 Bosworth Street. The branch was located at that site for almost 38 years, until the building that housed it was demolished during construction of Interstate 280. Glen Park Branch was then housed in several different locations over the course of 42 years until a multiuse building was constructed in the neighborhood at 2825 Diamond Street. Part of the new building was designated just for the library. The branch opened on October 13, 2007, and became the sixth branch to be renovated through the Branch Library Improvement Program.

=== Golden Gate Valley ===
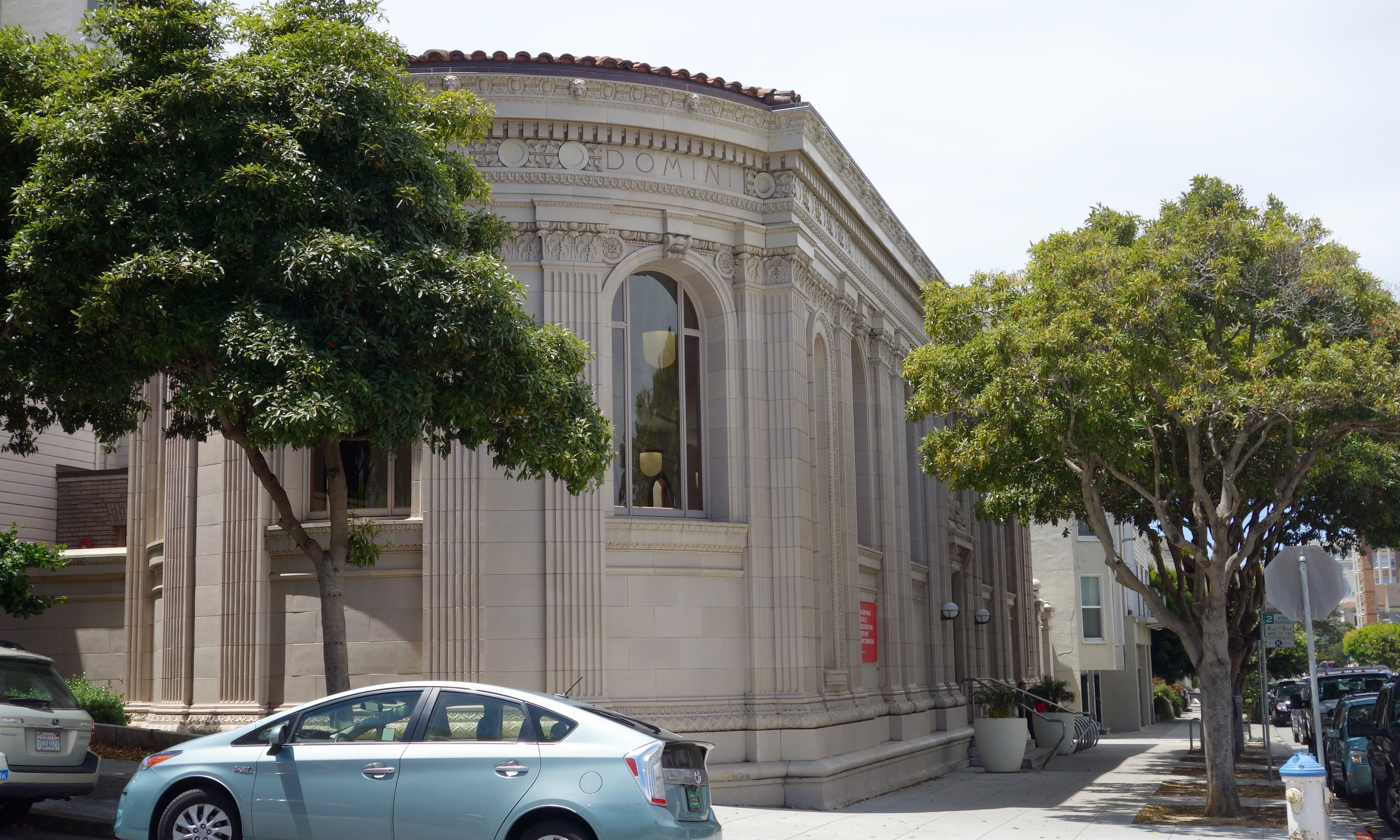
Golden Gate Valley Branch (2016)

In June 1917, to serve residents of the growing Golden Gate Valley, Cow Hollow, and Marina neighborhoods, construction of the Golden Gate Valley Branch Library was begun at a site on the southwest corner of Green and Octavia Streets that had been purchased by the city for $7,500. The resulting brick and terra cotta Beaux-Arts structure was designed in the shape of a basilica by local architect Ernest Coxhead. Though Carnegie grant funds paid for the building, City funds were used for the furnishings. The total cost of the building and furnishings came to $43,000, and on May 5, 1918, the branch was opened to the public. Golden Gate Valley Branch was the ninth branch established in the San Francisco Public Library system.

=== Ingleside ===
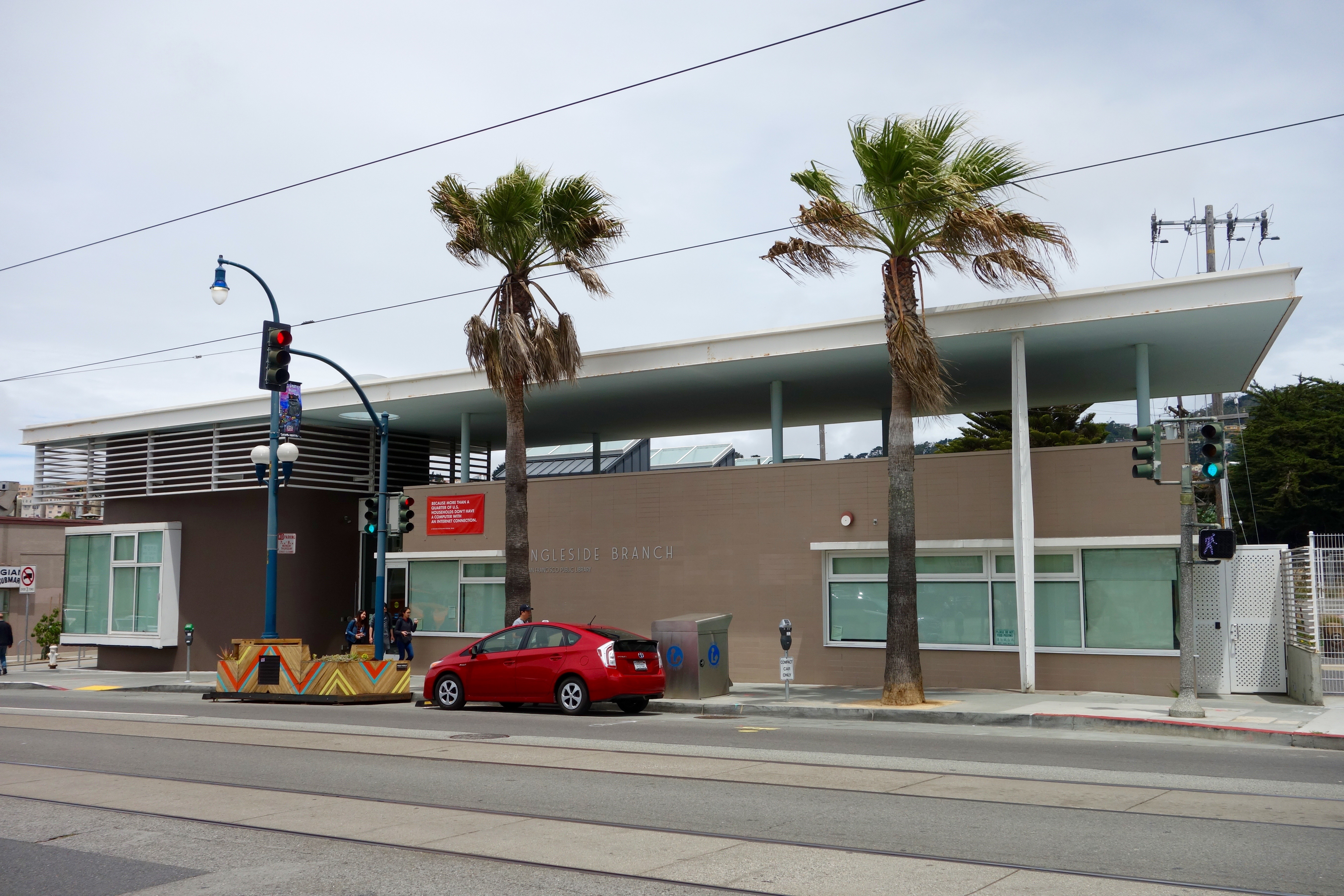
Ingleside Branch (current building, 2016)

The new Ingleside Branch opened on September 12, 2009. Ingleside Branch, the 11th in the system, opened in 1925. The neighborhood was served by "library station" at several locations, including 422 Holloway Avenue, 1612 Ocean Avenue and 387 Ashton Avenue. On May 30, 2001, the library moved to a leased facility—the former Bank of America building, at 1649 Ocean (at Faxon). The eagerly anticipated new branch building at 1298 Ocean Avenue (at Plymouth) opened in 2009.

=== Mission ===
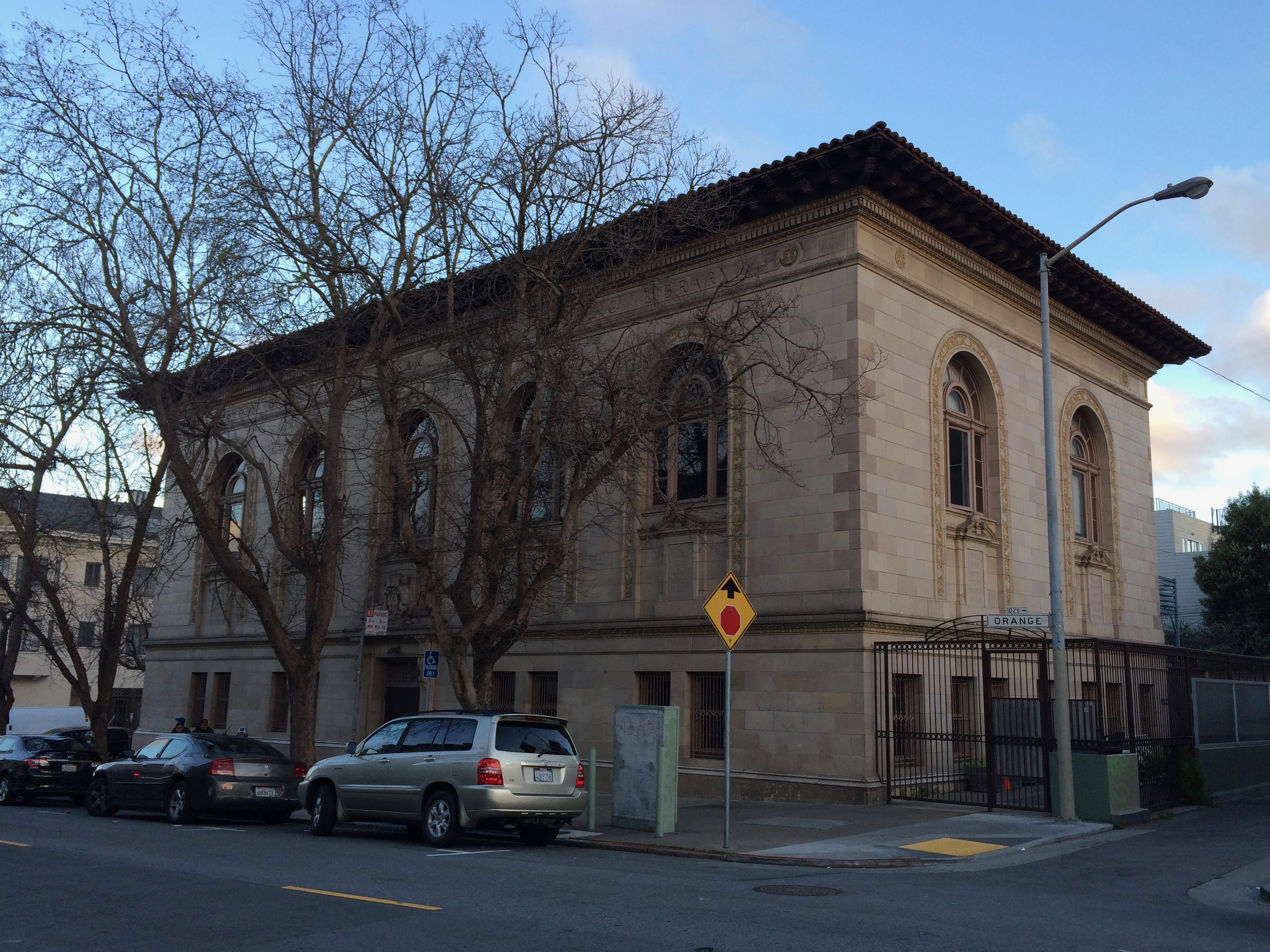
Mission Branch (2017)

The Mission Branch opened in 1888 in rented space as one of the system's first three branches. Its present building at 24th and Bartlett streets, designed by G. Albert Lansburgh, was completed in 1915 as the second of the city's seven Carnegie branch libraries. It became San Francisco Designated Landmark No. 234 in 2004. The branch closed in 2020 for a $40.7 million renovation that restored its original entrance and staircase and enlarged the building, and it reopened in November 2026.

=== Richmond ===
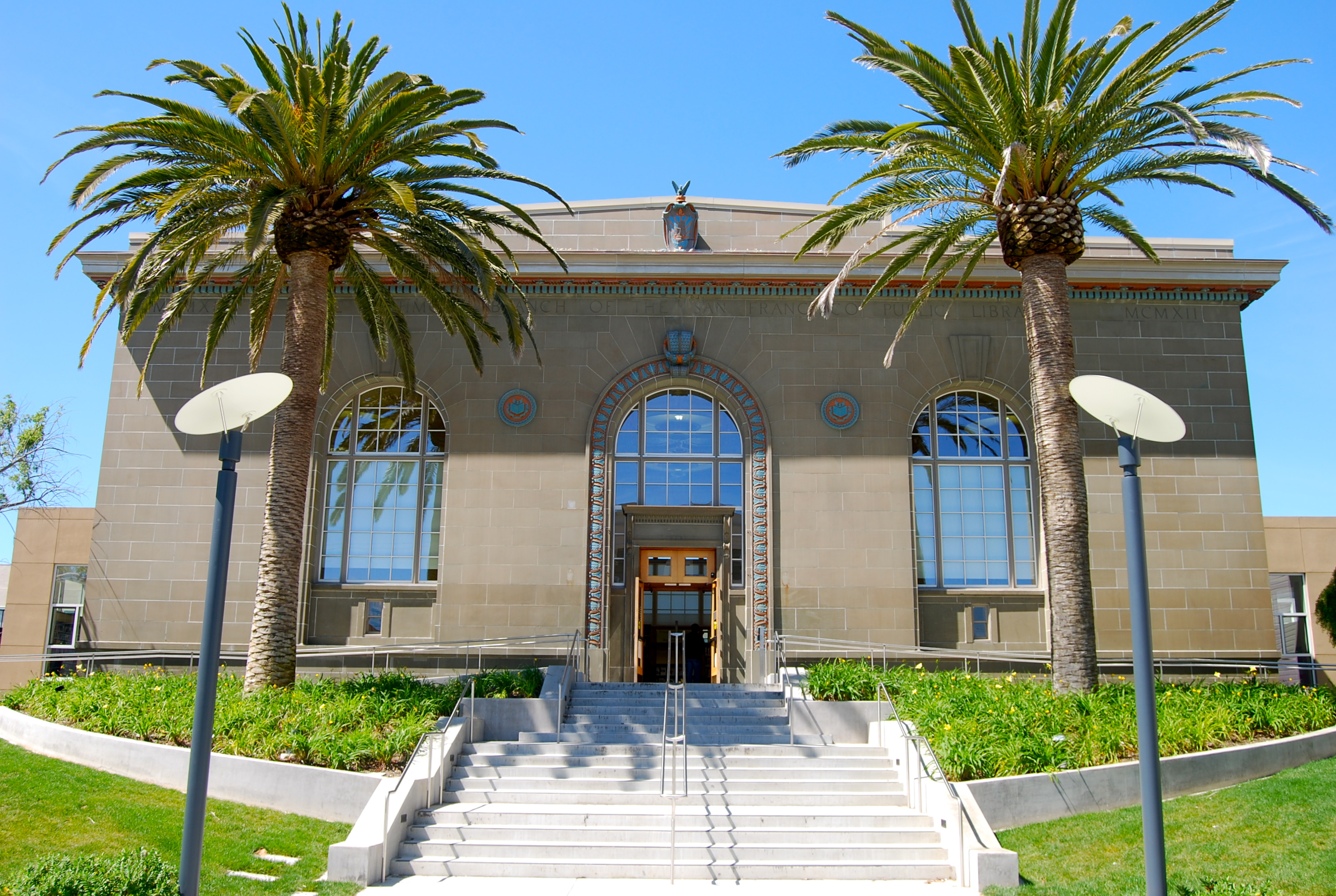
Richmond Branch (2010)

The Richmond Renovation was completed on May 16, 2009. Richmond/Senator Milton Marks Branch was the fourth branch established within the San Francisco Public Library system. The first location of the branch, in 1892, was at 809 Point Lobos Avenue (now Geary Boulevard) and Parker Avenue. In 1914 a new Richmond Branch opened at the current location, the first library building in San Francisco constructed with Andrew Carnegie grant funds. In December 2000, the San Francisco Landmarks Board nominated Richmond Branch Library for designation as a city landmark. Funded by both a City bond measure and $6 million in Proposition 14 State bond funds, a newly renovated, seismically safe, accessible and technologically updated building opened in 2009.

== Services ==
The San Francisco Public Library offers a "homeless and poverty outreach library team" with the help of the Department of Public Health that helps find housing and other services for homeless patrons who set up camp among the stacks. In 2009, in the San Francisco Public Library's Main Library, Leah Esguerra became the first library-based social worker.
