= 1905 Tsetserleg–Bulnay earthquakes =

Mw 8+ earthquake sequence in Mongolia

- UTC time: 1905-07-09 09:40:39; 1905-07-23 02:46:12
- ISC event: 16957859; 16957865
- USGS-ANSS: ComCat; ComCat
- Local date: 9 July 1905; 23 July 1905
- Local time: 17:40:39; 10:46:12
- Magnitude: M_{s} 7.9, M_{w} 8.0; M_{s} 8.25, M_{w} 8.3 (Note: M_{uk} 8.4, M_{w} 8.3-8.5, M_{L} 8.7, M_{m} 8.33)
- Depth: 15.0 km (9.3 mi)
- Epicenter: Northwestern Mongolia
- Areas affected: Mongolia
- Max. intensity: MMI VIII (Severe)

The 1905 Tsetserleg–Bulnay earthquakes occurred in remote northwestern Mongolia in July 1905. The magnitude 7.9–8.0 Tsetserleg shock struck on July 9 near the Tsetserleg Sum of Khövsgöl Province. The magnitude 8.25-8.4 Bulnay earthquake hit 2 weeks later on July 23 near Asgat Sum, Zavkhan Province. The Tsetserleg earthquake ruptured 190 km (120 mi) of fault, while the Bulnay earthquake ruptured 455 km (283 mi). Geological effects from the earthquakes were widespread, and well documented. This earthquake sequence remains of scientific interest for two reasons: the sequence is the "largest continental strike-slip earthquake sequence ever documented", and the earthquakes started a cascade of triggered ruptures starting with each other, along with the 1931 Fuyun and 1957 Mongolia earthquakes.

== Tectonic setting ==
The Bolnai fault system is a major left-lateral strike-slip fault system that runs east–west in Mongolia. It formed in reaction to the collision of the India plate with the Eurasia plate. The main fault segment of the Bolnai fault system is the Bolnai fault, which runs for 600 km (370 mi). The system slips at an average slip rate of around 3.1 mm (0.12 in)/yr, and has previously ruptured in similar earthquakes 2.3-4.0 kyr (Note: kyr = thousand years) ago. These previous fault ruptures likely occur in a similar manner as this sequence, as the fault displacements are similar.

Other major faults in the system include the Tsetserleg, Teregtiin, and Düngen faults. The Tsetserleg fault is a left-lateral strike-slip and reverse fault. The Teregtiin (also spelled Teregtyin and Teregtiyn) fault is a north-northwest trending dextral fault that splits off from the Bolnai fault. As it approaches the Bolnai fault, it has a reverse component, causing it to be an oblique fault in the area. The Düngen fault is a north–south trending (fault direction) dextral strike-slip fault that joins that runs perpendicularly from the Bolnai fault.

== Tsetserleg earthquake ==
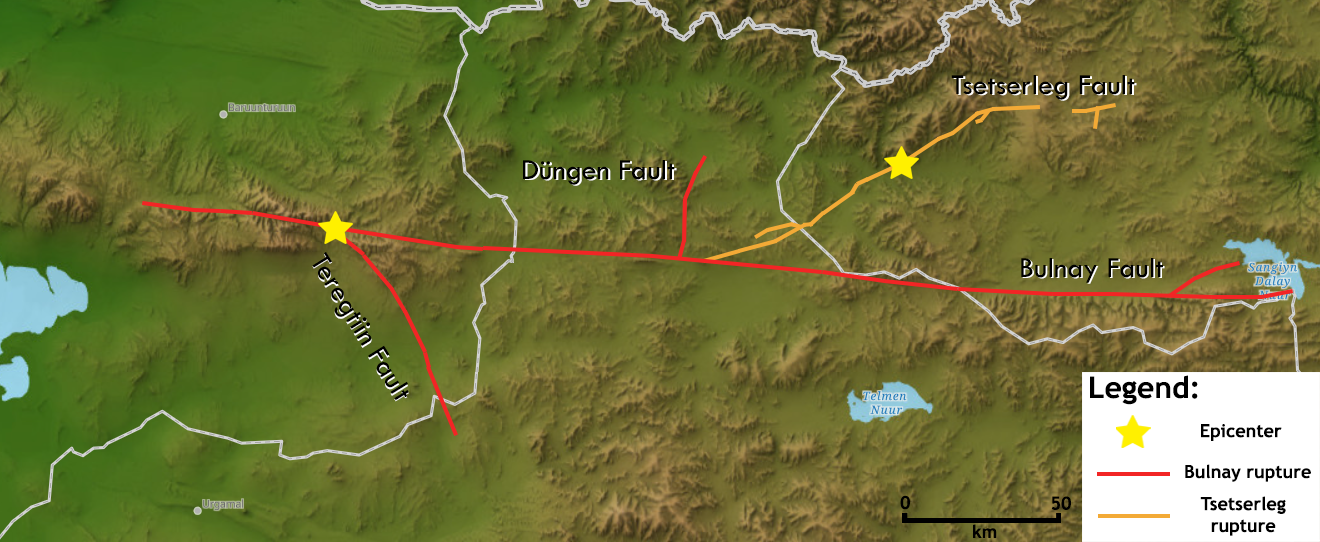
Map of 1905 Tsetserleg-Bulnay ruptures adapted from Choi et al. (2018)

The Tsetserleg earthquake struck remote northwestern Mongolia near Tsetserleg Sum of Khövsgöl Province at 17:40 local time on July 9, 1905. The M_{w} 8.0 earthquake had a clear left-lateral strike-slip surface rupture along the Tsetserleg fault for 130 km (81 mi), with an additional 60 km (37 mi) of rupture continuing northeastward and not breaking the surface. Average vertical displacement was around 1 m (3 ft 3 in), with strike slip ruptures averaging 2.3 m (7 ft 7 in). The rupture lasted for a total of 65 seconds.

== Bulnay earthquake ==
The Bulnay earthquake hit remote northwestern Mongolia near Asgat Sum, Zavkhan Province at 10:46 local time on July 23, 1905. The M_{w} 8.3 earthquake ruptured along multiple faults in the Bolnai fault system for a total rupture length of 455 km (283 mi). Rupture was unusually deep, with a maximum depth of 70 km (43 mi). The earthquake nucleated at the junction of the Bolnai and Teregtiin faults, and ruptured along both.

=== Bolnai fault rupture ===
On the Bolnai fault, the earthquake ruptured bilaterally. It ruptured west for 100 km (62 mi) and east for 275 km (171 mi). Average displacement was 8–11 m (26–36 ft) along the eastern segment of the fault, and 5 m (16 ft) to the west. The total average displacement was 8.9 m (29 ft) While the westward rupture had less on fault displacement, secondary features displayed enough slip to make up the difference compared to the eastern rupture, leading to an overall consistent displacement along the rupture.

=== Teregtiin and Düngen fault ruptures ===
Rupture also propagated initially along the Teregtiin fault, where it traveled southeast. The earthquake ruptured 80 km (50 mi) of the fault. Displacement measured between 2.2–3.0 m (7 ft 3 in – 9 ft 10 in) along the fault. Rupture on the Düngen fault started 24 seconds after rupture initiated. Rupture measured 20–30 km (12–19 mi). Displacement is estimated to be 1–2 m (3 ft 3 in – 6 ft 7 in). Multiple other faults ruptured, however their ruptures measured shorter than 10 km (6.2 mi). Overall rupture duration was 115 seconds.

== Surficial effects ==
=== Tsetserleg ===
Surface rupture was apparent for 130 km (81 mi). The Tsetserleg rupture produced tension gashes and mole tracks that correspond to sinistral faulting, a complex network of fissures formed that trended east-northeast. Some of these fissures formed in parallel and created horsts and grabens.

=== Bulnay ===
The Bulnay earthquake produced many surficial geologic effects. Surface rupture was visible for 350 km (220 mi) along the Bolnai fault. Mole tracks exceeding 1–2 m (3 ft 3 in – 6 ft 7 in) were common, and tension cracks approached and even exceeded 100 m (330 ft) in certain areas of the rupture. Short fissures were confined to areas adjacent to the rupture. Tension cracks had a north–south trend.

== Damage ==
Both earthquakes were felt over millions of square kilometers, however there are few records of the immediate effects of the earthquake due to the remoteness of Mongolia in 1905. However, rockslides were reported in the nearby mountains, and supposedly "two lakes, each of eight acres in size, disappeared". Tsetserleg was severely damaged.

== Scientific interest ==
This earthquake sequence was scientifically significant for two reasons: the fact that the earthquakes likely triggered each other (and then the 1931 Fuyun and 1957 Mongolia earthquakes), and the sheer sizes of the earthquakes. The earthquake sequence was the "largest continental strike-slip earthquake sequence ever documented." 23 research papers have been published on these earthquakes.

=== Triggering ===
In Mongolia, slip rates are low enough that the probabilities of multiple large (M_{w} 8+) earthquakes happening in the time span of half a century in an area where faults slip slowly is very unlikely. Studies, therefore, have investigated if there is a causal link between the ruptures. The original hypotheses was that the cause is postseismic stress relaxation, which is the process of the lithosphere realigning itself after an earthquake. Since the Coulomb stress transfer from the earthquakes wouldn't be enough to trigger failure on the relatively distant faults (~400 km (250 mi)) and this effect can impact faults at much further distances, this explanation is preferred. This mechanism is similar to the earthquakes triggered by the 1992 Landers earthquake. In Mongolia there are dozens of active faults. This triggering mechanism can be applied to any group of these faults. Another study builds upon the original hypotheses, but posits that Coulomb stress transfer and viscoleastic stress transfer may better help explain the earthquakes.

==== Related events ====
While the Tsetserleg earthquake likely triggered the Bulnay earthquake, The triggering mechanism also applies to the 1931 Fuyun earthquake and the 1957 Mongolia earthquake. Both earthquakes occurred within western Mongolia, and were likely also triggered by postseismic or viscoelastic stress relaxation, with the Bulnay earthquake triggering the 1931 Fuyun earthquake, which itself also helped trigger the 1957 Mongolia event.

=== Size of earthquakes ===
The earthquake sequence was the "largest continental strike-slip earthquake sequence ever documented." The Bulnay shock was also "one of the world's largest recorded intracontinental earthquakes." Earthquakes of this size in this area have recurrence intervals on the order of thousands of years, which makes these two earthquakes occurring in such close temporal proximity a scientific curiosity.

== See also ==
- List of earthquakes in 1905
- 1931 Fuyun earthquake
- 1957 Mongolia earthquake
