= HMS Dainty (D108) =

Destroyer of the Royal Navy

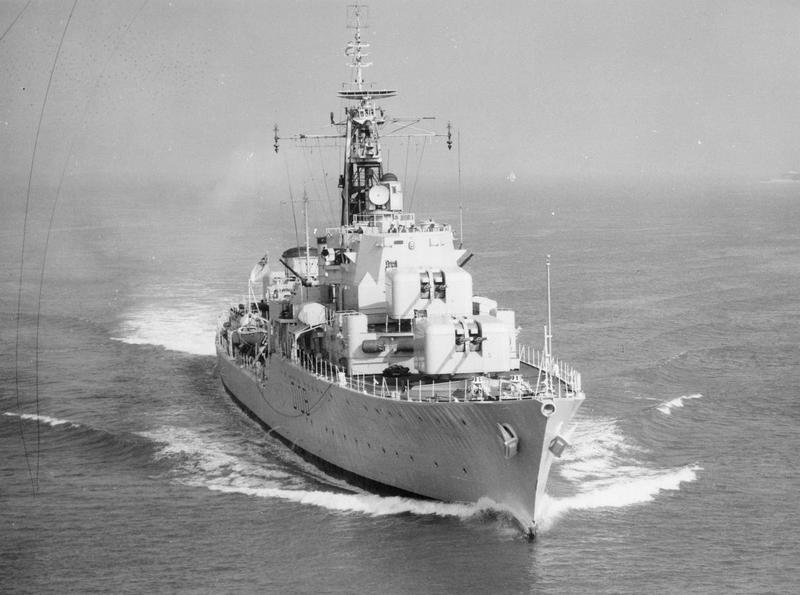
- Fore view of HMS Dainty, 22 October 1964.

History

United Kingdom
- Name: HMS Dainty
- Ordered: 24 January 1945
- Builder: J. Samuel White
- Laid down: 17 December 1945
- Launched: 16 August 1950
- Commissioned: 26 February 1953
- Identification: Pennant number: D108
- Fate: Sold for breaking, 1 January 1971

General characteristics
- Class & type: Daring-class destroyer
- Displacement: Standard: 2,830 tons; Full load: 3,820 tons
- Length: 390 ft (120 m)
- Beam: 43 ft (13 m)
- Draught: 13.6 ft (4.1 m)
- Installed power: 54,000 shp (40 MW)
- Propulsion: 2 × Foster Wheeler boilers 650 psi (4.5 MPa), 850 °F (454 °C)); 2 × Parsons steam turbines; 2 × shafts
- Speed: 30 knots (56 km/h)
- Range: 4,400 nautical miles (8,100 km) at 20 knots (37 km/h)
- Complement: Approximately 300
- Sensors & processing systems: Radar Type 293Q target indication; Radar Type 291 air warning; Radar Type 274 navigation; Radar Type 275 fire control on director Mk.VI; Radar Type 262 fire control on director CRBF and STAAG Mk.II
- Armament: 6 × QF 4.5 in /45 (114 mm) Mark V in 3 twin mountings UD Mark VI; 4 × 40 mm /60 Bofors A/A in 2 twin mounts STAAG Mk.II; 2 × 40 mm /60 Bofors A/A in 1 twin mount Mk.V; 2 × pentad tubes for 21 inch (533 mm) torpedoes Mk.IX; 1 × Squid anti submarine mortar

HMS Dainty was a Daring-class destroyer of the British Royal Navy. Ordered in 1945, she was built by J. Samuel White at their Isle of Wight shipyard, being launched in 1950 and completed in 1953.

She spent the initial years of her service alternating between the Mediterranean Sea and British waters, before undergoing modifications between 1958 and 1959 and again between 1962 and 1964. After further service, including spells in the West Indies and Far East, she was decommissioned in 1969 and sold for scrap in 1971.

== Construction ==
Dainty was one of eight Daring-class destroyers ordered on 24 January 1945, with a total of 16 ships ordered for the Royal Navy by the end of February that year. Eight of the 16 Darings were cancelled in December 1945, before they were laid down, but construction of the remaining eight ships continued, while three more were built by Australia.

The ship was laid down at J. Samuel White's Cowes, Isle of Wight shipyard on 17 December 1945 and was launched on 16 August 1950 and completed on 26 February 1953.

== Design ==
Dainty was 390 feet 0 inches (118.87 m) long overall, 375 feet 0 inches (114.30 m) at the waterline and 366 feet 0 inches (111.56 m) between perpendiculars. She had a beam of 43 feet 0 inches (13.11 m) and a draught of 13 feet 0 inches (3.96 m) deep load. Displacement was 2,610 long tons (2,650 t) standard and 3,350 long tons (3,400 t) deep load. The ship was of all-welded construction, and aluminium was used for internal bulkheads, in one of the first uses of this material in Royal Navy ships. Two Foster-Wheeler boilers supplied steam at 650 pounds per square inch (4,500 kPa) and 850 °F (454 °C) to two seats of Parsons double-reduction geared steam turbines, which in turn drove two propeller shafts. The machinery was rated at 54,000 shaft horsepower (40,000 kW), giving a maximum speed of 34 knots (39 mph; 63 km/h). The machinery was laid out in the unit arrangement, with two machinery spaces, each holding a boiler and turbine, separated by an empty compartment so that a single hit by hostile fire could not completely disable the ship. Dainty was one of four ships of the class that were built with Direct current (DC) electrical equipment, with the other four ships having more modern Alternating Current (AC) electrics. 618 tons of oil fuel were carried, sufficient to give a range of 4,400 nautical miles (5,100 mi; 8,100 km) at 20 knots (23 mph; 37 km/h).

The ship was armed with three twin QF 4.5-inch (113 mm) Mark VI dual-purpose gun mounts, with a close-in anti-aircraft armament of three twin Bofors 40 mm mounts, with two stabilised STAAG mounts and one simpler, non-stabilised Mark V (or "Utility") mount. Two quintuple mounts for 21-inch (533 mm) torpedoes were carried, while anti-submarine armament consisted of a Squid anti-submarine mortar with 30 charges. 3/8 inch (9.5 mm) thick splinter armour was provided for the bridge, gun turrets and turret rings, while 1/4 inch (6.4 mm) plating protected cable runs. The ship was fitted with a Type 293Q air/surface search radar on the foremast together with a Type 274 navigation radar and a Type 291 air warning radar on the ship's mainmast. A Mark 6 director, incorporating a Type 275 radar, was mounted on the roof of the ship's bridge. Dainty had a crew of 286 officers and other ranks.

== Service ==
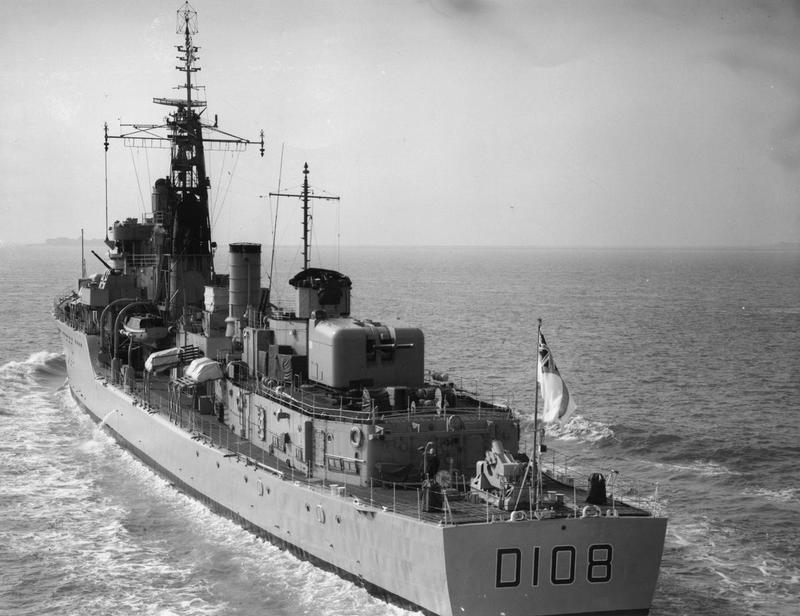
Aft view of Daring-class destroyer HMS Dainty, 22 October 1964 (IWM HU 129784)

On commissioning, the four ships with DC electrics, including Dainty, joined the Mediterranean Fleet, forming what would become the 2nd Destroyer Squadron. (Note: For a while, the Darings were not officially classified as destroyers by the Royal Navy due to their large size, but rather as 'Daring Class' ships.) with the AC electric ships forming what would become the 5th Destroyer Squadron in the Home Fleet. The two squadrons regularly swapped between the Mediterranean and Home Fleets. Dainty was laid up in reserve in December 1955, but briefly returned to active service in February 1956 as part of an exercise to test the arrangements for raising ships from reserve. After returning to reserve in April, she returned to active service with the 2nd Destroyer Flotilla in the Mediterranean later that year.

On 29 April 1957 Dainty delivered emergency supplies, including 2000 blankets and 300 tents along with medical supplies and a team of doctors to the town of Fethiye in Turkey which had been badly damaged by a pair of earthquakes. On 2 April 1958, Dainty collided with the destroyer Solebay when coming alongside Solebay at Portsmouth Harbour, with both destroyers being damaged in the collision. Dainty entered refit at Portsmouth (Note: English says Dainty was refitted at Devonport.) on 16 April that year, where her aft set of torpedo tubes was removed, allowing a deckhouse to be added containing additional accommodation, badly needed as the Darings' large crews meant that they were cramped.

Dainty was commissioned following the refit on 20 January 1959, when she became part of the 2nd Destroyer Squadron as part of the Home and Mediterranean Fleets. She was paid off into reserve again, along with the rest of the 2nd Squadron in January 1961. She was refitted again between 1962 and 1964. The remaining set of torpedo tubes was replaced by another deckhouse, while the two STAAG Bofors mounts were replaced by simpler Mark V utility twin Bofors mounts, and the Mark 6 director was replaced by the more modern MRS3 director. These changes greatly reduced the amount of maintenance required.

Dainty recommissioned at Portsmouth in April 1965 as a member of the 23rd Escort Squadron following the refit, serving in the Mediterranean and West Indies. She was back in home waters on 31 May – 1 June 1966 when she and sister ship Defender and the German frigates Karlsruhe and Braunschweig took part in ceremonies in the North Sea to mark the 50th anniversary of the Battle of Jutland. Another commission in April 1967 saw her serve two years in Home, West Indian and Far East Waters.

== Fate ==
Dainty was paid off for disposal at Portsmouth on 31 July 1969. Dainty was sold on 1 January 1971 and broken up at Cairnryan.

== Publications ==
- Blackman, Raymond V. B. (1960). Jane's Fighting Ships 1960–61. London: Sampson Low, Marston & Co. Ltd.
- Colledge, J. J.; Warlow, Ben (2006) [1969]. Ships of the Royal Navy: The Complete Record of All Fighting Ships of the Royal Navy from the 15th Century to the Present (3rd Rev ed.). London: Chatham Publishing. ISBN 978-1-86176-281-8. OCLC 67375475.
- Critchley, Mike (1982). British Warships Since 1945: Part 3: Destroyers. Liskeard, UK: Maritime Books. ISBN 0-9506323-9-2.
- English, John (2008). Obdurate to Daring: British Fleet Destroyers 1941–45. Windsor, UK: World Ship Society. ISBN 978-0-9560769-0-8.
- Friedman, Norman (2008). British Destroyers and Frigates: The Second World War and After. Barnsley, UK: Seaforth Publishing. ISBN 978-1-84832-015-4.
- Lenton, H.T. (1970). Navies of the Second World War: British Fleet & Escort Destroyers Volume Two. London: Macdonald & Co. ISBN 0-356-03122-5.
- Marriott, Leo (1989). Royal Navy Destroyers Since 1945. Shepperton, UK: Ian Allan. ISBN 0-7110-1817-0.
- McCart, Neil (2008). Daring Class Destroyers. Fan Publications. ISBN 978-1-904459-33-0.
