= 1957 Andreanof Islands earthquake =

Severe earthquake and tsunami in southwestern Alaska, USA

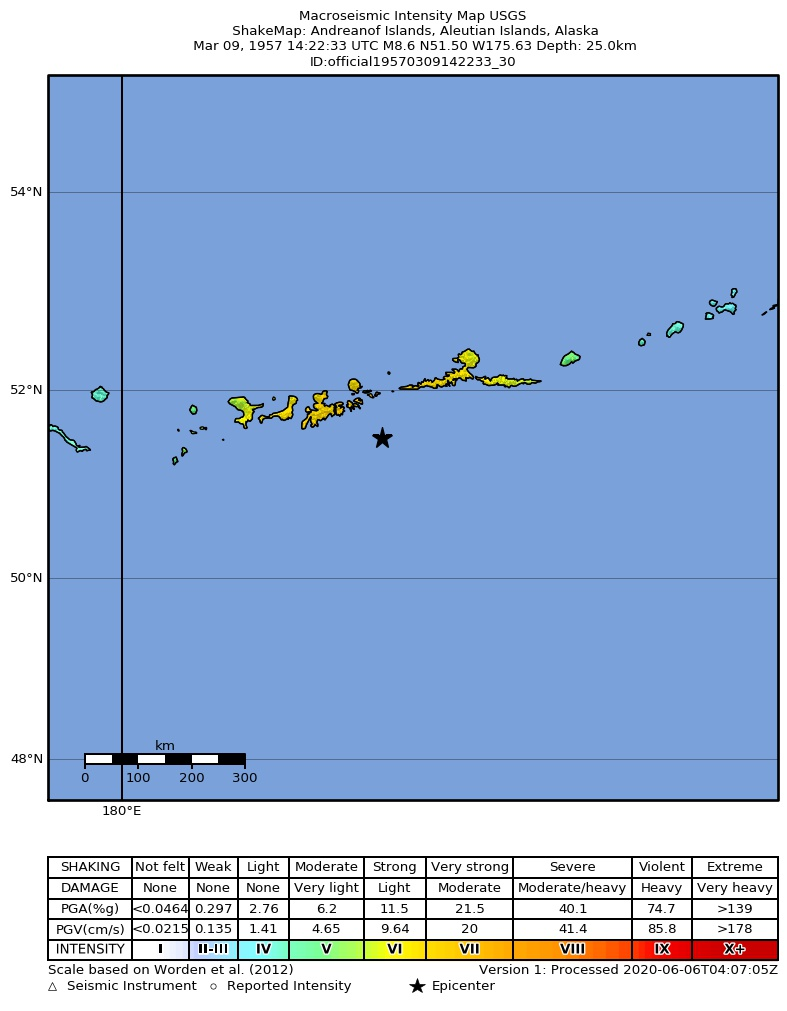
- USGS ShakeMap

- Location within Alaska
- UTC time: 1957-03-09 14:22:33
- ISC event: 886030
- USGS-ANSS: ComCat
- Local date: March 9, 1957
- Local time: 04:22:33
- Magnitude: 8.6 M_{w} 8.1–8.3 M_{s} 9.0 M_{t} (Note: Other estimates include mb 7.7, M_{s20} 8.2, and M 8.3.)
- Depth: 25 km (16 mi)
- Epicenter: 51.5°N 175.63°W
- Fault: Aleutian Trench
- Type: Megathrust
- Areas affected: Aleutian Islands & Hawaii
- Total damage: $5 million
- Max. intensity: MMI VIII (Severe)
- Tsunami: 23 m (75 ft)
- Casualties: 2 dead (indirect)

The 1957 Andreanof Islands earthquake occurred at 04:22 local time on March 9 with a moment magnitude estimated at 8.6 and a maximum Modified Mercalli intensity of VIII (Severe). It occurred south of the Andreanof Islands group, which is part of the Aleutian Islands arc. The event occurred along the Aleutian Trench, the convergent plate boundary that separates the Pacific plate and the North American plates near Alaska. A basin-wide tsunami followed, with effects felt in Alaska and Hawaii, and strong waves recorded across the Pacific rim. Total losses were around $5 million (equivalent to $57,316,351 in 2025).

== Tectonic setting ==
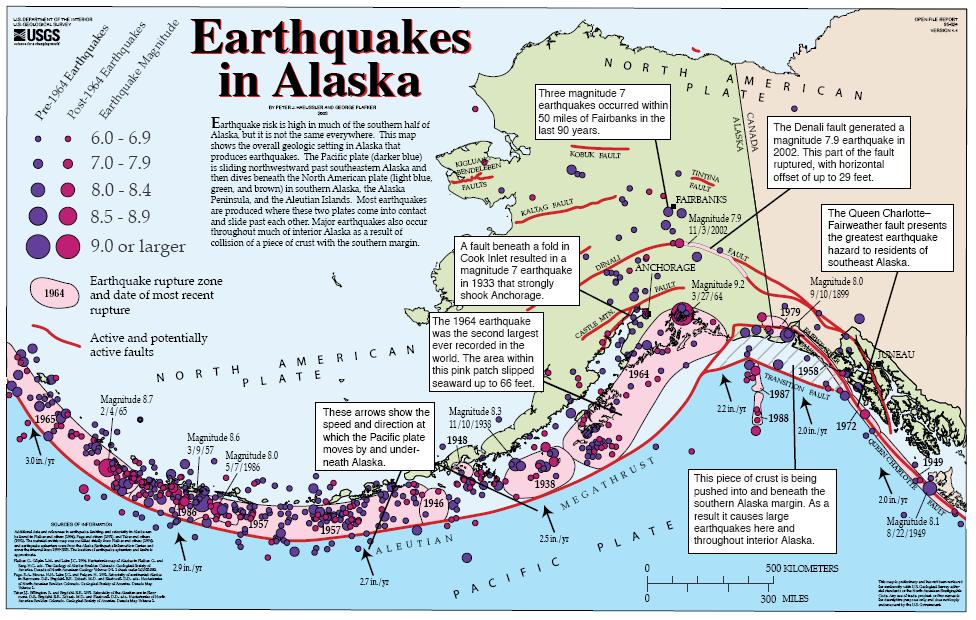
Map showing the tectonics and seismicity of Alaska

The Aleutian Islands lie between Kamchatka and mainland Alaska. They were formed as the result of the 4,000 km (2,500 mi) long convergent boundary that accommodates the subduction of the oceanic Pacific plate underneath the continental North American plate. This oceanic trench runs from the Kuril-Kamchatka Trench in the west to the Yakutat Collision Zone in the east. Most of the trench ruptured in a sequence of earthquakes from east to west. Earthquakes in 1938, 1946, 1948, and 1965 generally progressed westward with smaller earthquakes filling in any gaps. At each terminus of the subduction zone, convergence ends in favor of right-lateral transform faults. In the west, convergence becomes increasingly oblique until the Commander Islands where faulting is nearly completely strike-slip—a 2017 earthquake was associated with this tectonic setting. The plate boundary ends at the Kuril-Kamchatka Trench. In the east, the Pacific plate continues to subduct underneath the North American plate until the Yakutat microplate. There, a transition from subduction to strike-slip faulting exists. When this transition ends, faulting is completely right-lateral transform and is largely accommodated along the Queen Charlotte Fault.

== Earthquake ==
The seismic intensity peaked at VIII (Severe) on the Modified Mercalli intensity scale at Adak and Umnak. As the shock occurred before the World Wide Standardised Seismological Network was in operation, few instruments recorded the event, and its mechanism is not understood well as a result. Some effort was made with the limited data to gain an understanding of the rupture area and the distribution of slip. One aspect of the event that was certain was that the 1,200–1,230 km (750–760 mi) aftershock zone was one of the largest that had ever been observed, comparable to the approximate lower rupture length limit of the 2004 Indian Ocean earthquake. The aftershock zone may slightly overlap other ruptures, however there is minimal overlap between the aftershocks of the 1946 Aleutian Islands earthquake to the east and the 1965 Rat Islands earthquake to the west. Studies of the event differ on rupture characteristics. Some suggest a rupture zone greater than 600 km (370 mi), stretching from Amchitka Pass in the east to Unimak Pass in the west. Other studies have the rupture area at a significantly longer 850 km (530 mi). Yet other studies conclude that the entirety of the aftershock area ruptured in the earthquake, for a total rupture length of 1,200 km (750 mi). The western portion of the rupture stopped at Bowers Ridge. Studies also disagree on whether the easternmost area near Unalaska ruptured. Some of the early scientific papers conclude that this area remained unruptured during the event and remains a seismic gap. Others, especially ones written decades after the fact, conclude that slip did occur here, but signals from it were blocked by the coda of the main slip. However, the amount of slip is not agreed upon. Some studies support a low amount of slip, while others conclude that there was large amounts of slip in this area, up to 20 m (66 ft). A maximum slip of 20 m (66 ft) was estimated in the eastern portion of the rupture. If the eastern portion of the megathrust did rupture, then a magnitude of M_{w} 9.0–9.1 is more reflective of the event. The tsunami created by the earthquake suggests a (M_{t} 9.0) event. The earthquake was previously assigned magnitude 9.1 and subsequent analysis have revised it to magnitude 8.6.

== Tsunami ==
Teletsunami observations
Location	Recorded height (m)
Hāʻena, Kauai County, Hawaii, Hawaii	16.1
Wainiha, Hawaii, Hawaii	11.6
Pololu Valley, Hawaii	9.8
Oahu, Hawaii	7.0
Fagasā, American Samoa	1.5
Crescent City, California	0.7
San Diego, California	0.2

Tsunami waves were reported in faraway places such as in Chile. The tsunami's strength led to suspicion that a landslide may have contributed to its severity, but there was no clear evidence of one. A submarine landslide is considered inconsistent with the wave patterns recorded, and the high wave heights could be explained by large amounts of near-trench slip. However, a newer study using Alvin has apparently found evidence for a landslide. "According to the findings, the landslide extends for approximately 10 miles and exhibits signs of slope failure, including a chaotic debris zone, a scalloped headwall, and runout lobes that descend towards a deeper basin."

=== Alaska ===
Wave heights were the highest in Alaska. On Unimak Island, waves reached as high as 23 m (75 ft). Also on Unimak, near the Scotch Cap Lighthouse that was destroyed in the 1946 earthquake, run up heights of 12–15 m (39–49 ft) were observed. Trappers Cove recorded wave heights of 13.7 m (45 ft). At Sand Bay, the tsunami reached 8 m (26 ft). Dutch Harbor in Unalaska recorded waves of 0.7 m (2 ft 4 in), Massacre Bay in Attu recorded waves up to 0.6 m (2 ft 0 in) high and Sitka had waves reaching 0.4 m (1 ft 4 in). At Yakutat run-ups measured 0.3 m (1 ft 0 in), while Womens Bay, Kodiak, Seward, and Juneau had recorded tsunami heights of 0.2 m (7.9 in).

=== Hawaii ===
On the island of Kauai, the wave height reached 16.1 metres (53 ft) at Haena. In northern Oahu, wave heights reached 7 m (23 ft). Various areas around Big Island recorded tsunami waves with heights ranging 1–9.8 m (3 ft 3 in – 32 ft 2 in), including a reading of 3.9 m (13 ft) at Hilo. In Kahului, Maui, tide gauges recorded waves up to 1.8 m (5 ft 11 in). Coconut Island was submerged by 1 m (3 ft 3 in).

=== California ===
Crescent City recorded a tsunami wave of 0.7 m (2 ft 4 in). Los Angeles recorded run-ups of 0.5 m (1 ft 8 in), Santa Monica experienced a 0.5 m (1 ft 8 in)-high tsunami, while Anaheim Bay had 0.4 m (1 ft 4 in) waves. San Francisco's tide gauge recorded run-ups of 0.3 m (1 ft 0 in). In San Diego, a 1 m (3 ft 3 in) wave caused minor damage, however the tide gauge only recorded a wave 0.2 m (7.9 in) high. Other tide gauges across the state recorded run-up heights of 0.1–0.5 m (3.9 in – 1 ft 7.7 in).

=== Elsewhere ===
At Fagasā, American Samoa, tsunami run-up heights reached 1.5 m (4 ft 11 in). Pago Pago recorded wave heights of 0.3 m (1 ft 0 in), however the amplitude of the wave was 1.2 m (3 ft 11 in). Midway recorded tsunami waves up to 0.5 m (1 ft 8 in) high. Wake Island recorded amplitudes of 0.4 m (1 ft 4 in), Kwajalein and Enewetak recorded heights of 0.3 m (1 ft 0 in). Johnston Atoll experienced waves of 0.1 m (3.9 in), while waves less than 0.1 m (3.9 in) were recorded at Guam and Chuuk Lagoon. In Mexico, the tidal gauge in Ensenada, Baja California recorded the strongest waves at 1.0 m (3.4 ft). Many countries in Central America also recorded tsunami run-ups including 0.24 m (0.8 ft) at Puntarenas, Costa Rica, 0.18 m (0.6 ft) at Puerto San José, Guatemala, and 0.061 m (0.2 ft) waves at La Unión, El Salvador. Peru and Chile were favorably oriented for large waves from the tsunami, and as a result strong waves were recorded. In Peru, the strongest wave heights of 1.3 m (4.2 ft) were recorded at Matarani, with other coastal areas recording wave heights of 0.27–0.79 m (0.9–2.6 ft). Valparaíso, Chile recorded wave heights of 2.0 m (6.7 ft), which were the highest across the country. Across the rest of the country, wave heights of 0.91 m (3.0 ft), 0.91 m (3.0 ft), 1.3 m (4.2 ft), and 1.4 m (4.6 ft) were recorded at Arica, Antofagasta, Caldera, and Talcahuano, respectively.

== Damage ==
Prompt warnings from the Seismic Sea Wave Warning System were credited with preventing major damage or loss of life. The earthquake caused severe damage to roads and buildings on Adak including a crack 4.5 m (15 ft) in size, however there were no deaths. Two bridges and some oil and fuel-related structures at a dock were also destroyed there. On Umnak, a concrete mixer and some docks were lost. At Chernofski, Trappers Cove, and Vsevidof, strong waves drowned sheep. Oil pipelines were damaged at Sand Bay. Many boats were damaged by strong waves.

The tsunami caused twice the damage that the tsunami of the 1946 earthquake did. In Hawaii, damage was much more extensive, including two indirect fatalities that occurred when a pilot and photographer were killed while attempting to document the tsunami's arrival from an airplane. About 50 homes were flooded on the north shore of Oahu and significant effects were seen in Waialua Bay. Buildings and bridges were also flooded in Haleiwa. In Hilo, the tsunami damaged buildings. The total damage cost was over $5 million ($46 million in 2017).

== See also ==
- List of earthquakes in 1957
- List of earthquakes in Alaska
- List of earthquakes in the United States
- Mount Vsevidof
