= 1957 Mongolia earthquake =

Earthquake in Mongolia

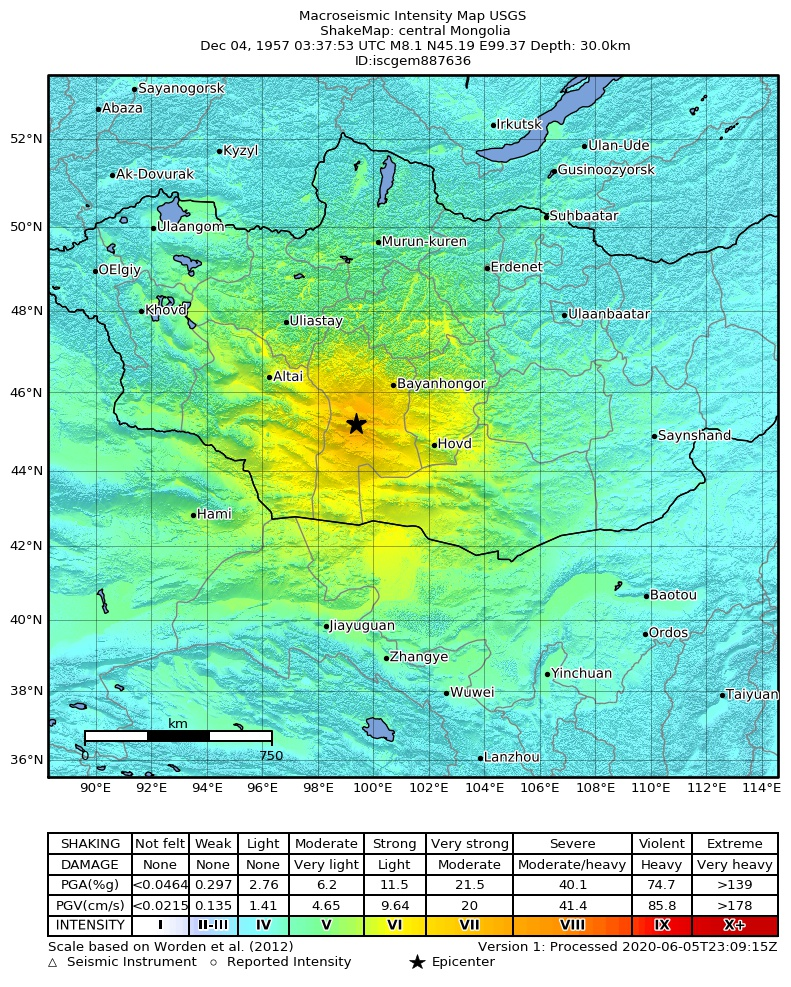
- USGS ShakeMap

- Location within Mongolia
- UTC time: 1957-12-04 03:37:53
- ISC event: 887636
- USGS-ANSS: ComCat
- Local date: December 4, 1957
- Local time: 11:37:53
- Magnitude: M_{w} 7.8–8.1, M_{s} 8.0–8.5
- Depth: 20.0 km (12.4 mi)
- Epicenter: 45.189°N 99.368°E
- Areas affected: Mongolian People's Republic
- Max. intensity: MMI XII (Extreme)
- Aftershocks: Yes, M_{s} 6.5 & M 6.8
- Casualties: 30

An earthquake occurred in southern Mongolia on December 4, 1957, measuring M_{w} 7.8–8.1 and assigned XII (Extreme) on the Modified Mercalli intensity scale. Surface faulting was observed in the aftermath with peak vertical and horizontal scarp reaching 9 m (30 ft). Because of the extremely sparse population in the area, this event, despite its magnitude, was not catastrophic. However, 30 people died and the towns of Dzun Bogd, Bayan-leg and Baruin Bogd were completely destroyed.

== Tectonic setting ==
As the Indian plate collides with the Eurasian plate, the force of the collision causes deformation. A primary effect of this collision is the uplift of the Himalayas; however, deformation extends further. In Mongolia, escape tectonics created a network of active faults to support the strike-slip stresses. During this earthquake, two main faults sustained a rupture: the thrust Gurvan Bulag fault, and the related strike-slip Bogd fault. The Gurvan Bulag has a slip rate of 1.05 ± 0.25 mm (0.0413 ± 0.0098 in)/yr for the vertical component, with slip rate increasing at the end of the Pleistocene epoch. Paleoseismological investigation revealed that the average recurrence interval of earthquakes like the 1957 event on the fault had decreased from 50 kyr (Note: kyr = thousand years) to 3-14 kyr in the late Pleistocene. The Bogd fault is a large left-lateral strike-slip fault. It is split into five distinct segments. Slip rates vary between segments, but it is between 0.5–1 mm (0.020–0.039 in)/yr overall. Recurrence intervals of 1957 type events on the Bogd fault have been calculated at around 1,000 years. Other large (M_{w} 8.0+) earthquakes had struck Mongolia in the previous half century, including the 1905 Tsetserleg, 1905 Bolnai, and 1931 Fuyun earthquakes. Some studies indicate that these earthquakes triggered each other, with the earlier ones triggering the later events.

== Earthquake ==
The earthquake struck southern Mongolia at 11:37:53 local time on December 4, 1957. Rupture was complex, with multiple scenarios proposed. The original hypothesis was that the earthquake occurred along the strike-slip Bogd fault and ruptured for 560 km (350 mi), however, the more recently adopted conclusion is that there was a 250–300 km (160–190 mi) long strike-slip rupture at a width of 20–30 km (12–19 mi) with 100 km (62 mi) of simultaneous reverse faulting in a roughly east–west direction. Offsets from surface rupture reached up to 8.85 m (29.0 ft) of strike-slip rupture, with 9 m (30 ft) vertical offsets, and an average slip of 3–4 m (9.8–13.1 ft). According to a study on the earthquake's surface rupture, the authors consider the rupture the "world's best preserved surface rupture of a great earthquake". The average slip decreased from west to east. Ruptured fault splays were observed up to 30 km (19 mi) away from the main fault trace. Large aftershocks struck the epicentral region after the mainshock. Shortly after the mainshock, a M_{s} 6.5 event struck. On April 7, 1958, another large earthquake measuring M 6.8 struck, located in the epicentral region of the mainshock.

== Impact ==
Despite attaining the maximum value on the Modified Mercalli intensity scale of XII (Extreme), the earthquake did not cause significant disruption to population centers owing to its remote and unpopulated location. Dzun Bogd, Bayan-leg and Baruin Bogd, however, were destroyed. Due to good weather, shepherds of these herding communities were outside, which limited the death toll to 30. Major geological effects were also observed. Surface offsets reaching 9 m (30 ft) of both strike-slip and vertical motion were observed after the event. Subsidence was also observed. At the Bakhar Mountains, a 15 km (9.3 mi) long and 800 m (2,600 ft) wide portion of the earth subsided due to the earthquake. In the Bitüüt valley, a large landslide was triggered.

== See also ==
- List of earthquakes in 1957
