= List of earthquakes in 1905 =

Earthquakes in 1905
Approximate epicenters of the earthquakes in 1905
- 4.0–5.9 magnitude
- 6.0–6.9 magnitude
- 7.0–7.9 magnitude
- 8.0+ magnitude
- Strongest: Qing Dynasty 2 events reached magnitude 8.3
- Deadliest: British Raj Himachal Pradesh, April 4 (Magnitude 7.9) 20,000 deaths
- Total fatalities: 22,802

Number by magnitude
- 9.0+: 0
- 8.0–8.9: 2
- 7.0–7.9: 20
- 6.0–6.9: 20
- 5.0–5.9: 1

This is a list of earthquakes in 1905. Only magnitude 6.0 or greater earthquakes appear on the list. Exceptions to this are earthquakes which have caused death, injury or damage. Events which occurred in remote areas will be excluded from the list as they wouldn't have generated significant media interest. All dates are listed according to UTC time. Several events during the year provided some interest. The most notable was a devastating quake which struck India in April. With 19,000 deaths this was the deadliest quake in the infancy of the 20th century.

== Overall ==
=== By death toll ===
Rank	Death toll	Magnitude	Location	MMI	Depth (km)	Date
1	20,000	7.9	British Raj, Himachal Pradesh	X (Extreme)	20.0	April 4
2	2,500	7.2	Kingdom of Italy, Calabria	XI (Extreme)	15.0	September 8
3	120	6.6	Albania, Shkodër County	X (Extreme)	20.0	June 1
4	101	6.8	Ottoman Empire, Malatya Province	IX (Violent)	10.0	December 4
5	57	7.1	Empire of Japan, off east coast of Honshu	( )	35.0	July 6
6	13	5.0	Qing Dynasty, Sichuan	VI (Strong)	0.0	November 8
7	11	7.0	Empire of Japan, Hiroshima Prefecture, Honshu	( )	55.0	June 2

- Note: At least 10 casualties

=== By magnitude ===
Rank	Magnitude	Death toll	Location	MMI	Depth (km)	Date
1	8.3	0	Qing Dynasty, Khövsgöl Province	( )	15.0	July 9
1	8.3	0	Qing Dynasty, Zavkhan Province	( )	15.0	July 23
3	7.9	20,000	British Raj, Himachal Pradesh	X (Extreme)	20.0	April 4
3	7.9	2,500	Kingdom of Italy, Calabria	XI (Extreme)	15.0	September 8
4	7.8	0	Dutch East Indies, Minahassa Peninsula	( )	90.0	January 22
5	7.4	0	Kingdom of Greece, Aegean Sea	X (Extreme)	15.0	November 8
6	7.3	0	New Zealand, Kermadec Islands	( )	60.0	March 18
6	7.3	0	Empire of Japan, off northeast coast of Hokkaido	( )	250.0	September 1
6	7.3	0	Russian Empire, Commander Islands	( )	0.0	September 15
9	7.2	0	United States, Andreanof Islands, Alaska	( )	0.0	February 14
9	7.2	0	Solomon Islands, Santa Cruz Islands	( )	0.0	March 18
9	7.2	0	Empire of Japan, Volcano Islands	( )	450.0	July 11
9	7.2	0	Empire of Japan, off south coast of Honshu	( )	250.0	October 24
14	7.1	0	Tonga	( )	0.0	June 30
14	7.1	57	Empire of Japan, off east coast of Honshu	( )	35.0	July 6
14	7.1	0	Mexico, Revilla Gigedo Islands	( )	0.0	December 17
17	7.0	0	United States, south of the Andreanof Islands, Alaska	( )	0.0	March 22
17	7.0	11	Empire of Japan, Hiroshima Prefecture, Honshu	( )	55.0	June 2
17	7.0	0	Tonga	( )	0.0	June 14
17	7.0	0	Qing Dynasty Khövsgöl Province	( )	20.0	July 11

- Note: At least 7.0 magnitude

== Notable events ==
=== January ===
January
- Strongest: 7.8 M_{w} Indonesia
- Total fatalities: 0

Number by magnitude
- 8.0–8.9: 0
- 7.0–7.9: 1
- 6.0–6.9: 2

Date	Country and location	M_{w}	Depth (km)	MMI	Notes	Casualties	
Date	Country and location	M_{w}	Depth (km)	MMI	Notes	Dead	Injured
13	German New Guinea, Ninigo Islands	6.8	0.0		Depth unknown.		
20	Costa Rica, Puntarenas Province	6.8	0.0		Some damage was caused. Depth unknown.		
22	Dutch East Indies, Minahassa Peninsula	7.8	90.0				

=== February ===
February
- Strongest: 7.2 M_{w} United States
- Total fatalities: 0

Number by magnitude
- 8.0–8.9: 0
- 7.0–7.9: 1
- 6.0–6.9: 3

Date	Country and location	M_{w}	Depth (km)	MMI	Notes	Casualties	
Date	Country and location	M_{w}	Depth (km)	MMI	Notes	Dead	Injured
14	United States, Andreanof Islands, Alaska	7.2	0.0		Depth unknown.		
17	British Raj, Sagaing Region	6.8	0.0		Depth unknown.		
19	(United Kingdom) Solomon Islands, Santa Cruz Islands	6.8	0.0		Depth unknown.		
27	Tonga	6.9	0.0		Depth unknown.		

=== March ===
March
- Strongest: 7.3 M_{w} New Zealand
- Total fatalities: 0

Number by magnitude
- 8.0–8.9: 0
- 7.0–7.9: 3
- 6.0–6.9: 2

Date	Country and location	M_{w}	Depth (km)	MMI	Notes	Casualties	
Date	Country and location	M_{w}	Depth (km)	MMI	Notes	Dead	Injured
4	German New Guinea, Bismarck Sea	6.9	60.0				
4	German New Guinea, Bismarck Sea	6.8	0.0		Doublet earthquake. Depth unknown.		
18	New Zealand, Kermadec Islands	7.3	60.0				
18	Solomon Islands, Santa Cruz Islands	7.2	0.0		Depth unknown.		
22	United States, south of Andreanof Islands, Alaska	7.0	0.0		Depth unknown.		

=== April ===
April
- Strongest: 7.9 M_{w} British Raj
- Deadliest: 7.9 M_{w} British Raj; 20,000 deaths
- Total fatalities: 20,000

Number by magnitude
- 8.0–8.9: 0
- 7.0–7.9: 1
- 6.0–6.9: 3

Date	Country and location	M_{w}	Depth (km)	MMI	Notes	Casualties	
Date	Country and location	M_{w}	Depth (km)	MMI	Notes	Dead	Injured
4	British Raj, Himachal Pradesh	7.9	20.0	X	The 1905 Kangra earthquake resulted in 20,000 deaths. Major damage was caused in the area.	20,000	
15	Ottoman Empire, Bursa Province	6.5	33.0	X	Directly under Bursa.		
19	New Zealand, Kermadec Islands	6.8	0.0		Depth unknown.		
26	Chile, Tarapaca Region	6.8	60.0				

=== May ===
May
- Strongest: 6.9 M_{w} German New Guinea
- Total fatalities: 0

Number by magnitude
- 8.0–8.9: 0
- 7.0–7.9: 0
- 6.0–6.9: 1

Date	Country and location	M_{w}	Depth (km)	MMI	Notes	Casualties	
Date	Country and location	M_{w}	Depth (km)	MMI	Notes	Dead	Injured
18	German New Guinea, Bismarck Sea	6.9	0.0				

=== June ===
June
- Strongest: 7.1 M_{w} Tonga
- Deadliest: 6.6 M_{w} Albania; 120 deaths
- Total fatalities: 131

Number by magnitude
- 8.0–8.9: 0
- 7.0–7.9: 3
- 6.0–6.9: 1

Date	Country and location	M_{w}	Depth (km)	MMI	Notes	Casualties	
Date	Country and location	M_{w}	Depth (km)	MMI	Notes	Dead	Injured
1	Albania, Shkoder County	6.6	20.0	X	120 people were killed. Damage costs were put at $23.8 million (1905 rate).	120	
2	Empire of Japan, Hiroshima Prefecture, Honshu	7.0	55.0		11 people were killed. 59 homes were damaged or destroyed.	11	
14	Tonga	7.0	0.0		Depth unknown.		
30	Tonga	7.1	0.0		Depth unknown.		

=== July ===
July
- Strongest: 8.3 M_{w} Qing Dynasty 2 events
- Deadliest: 7.1 M_{w} Japan; 57 deaths
- Total fatalities: 57

Number by magnitude
- 8.0–8.9: 2
- 7.0–7.9: 3
- 6.0–6.9: 2

Date	Country and location	M_{w}	Depth (km)	MMI	Notes	Casualties	
Date	Country and location	M_{w}	Depth (km)	MMI	Notes	Dead	Injured
6	Empire of Japan, off the east coast of Honshu	7.1	35.0		A tsunami was generated resulting in 57 deaths.	57	
6	Empire of Japan, Sea of Japan	6.5	100.0				
9	Qing Dynasty, Khovsgol Province	8.3	15.0		Further information: 1905 Tsetserleg–Bulnay earthquakes		
11	Qing Dynasty, Khovsgol Province	7.0	20.0		Aftershock.		
11	Empire of Japan, Volcano Islands	7.2	450.0				
14	Qing Dynasty, Khovsgol Province	6.5	20.0		Aftershock.		
23	Qing Dynasty, Zavkhan Province	8.3	15.0		Further information: 1905 Tsetserleg–Bulnay earthquakes		

=== August ===
August
- Strongest: 6.6 M_{w} Qing Dynasty
- Total fatalities: 0

Number by magnitude
- 8.0–8.9: 0
- 7.0–7.9: 0
- 6.0–6.9: 1

Date	Country and location	M_{w}	Depth (km)	MMI	Notes	Casualties	
Date	Country and location	M_{w}	Depth (km)	MMI	Notes	Dead	Injured
25	Qing Dynasty, Jilin	6.6	500.0				

=== September ===
September
- Strongest: 7.9M_{w}
- Deadliest: 7.9 M_{w} Kingdom of Italy; 2,500 deaths
- Total fatalities: 2,500

Number by magnitude
- 8.0–8.9: 0
- 7.0–7.9: 3
- 6.0–6.9: 1

Date	Country and location	M_{w}	Depth (km)	MMI	Notes	Casualties	
Date	Country and location	M_{w}	Depth (km)	MMI	Notes	Dead	Injured
1	Empire of Japan, off the northeast coast of Hokkaido	7.3	250.0				
8	Kingdom of Italy, Calabria	7.9	15.0	XI	The 1905 Calabria earthquake caused at least 2,500 deaths. Major damage was reported.	2,500	
15	Russian Empire, Commander Islands	7.3	0.0		Depth unknown.		
26	British Raj, Rajasthan	6.9	60.0				

=== October ===
October
- Strongest: 7.2 M_{w} Empire of Japan
- Total fatalities: 0

Number by magnitude
- 8.0–8.9: 0
- 7.0–7.9: 1
- 6.0–6.9: 1

Date	Country and location	M_{w}	Depth (km)	MMI	Notes	Casualties	
Date	Country and location	M_{w}	Depth (km)	MMI	Notes	Dead	Injured
21	Russian Empire, Abkhazia	6.4	15.0				
24	Empire of Japan, off the south coast of Honshu	7.2	250.0				

=== November ===
November
- Strongest: 7.4 M_{w} Kingdom of Greece
- Deadliest: 5.0 M_{w} Qing Dynasty; 13 deaths
- Total fatalities: 13

Number by magnitude
- 8.0–8.9: 0
- 7.0–7.9: 1
- 6.0–6.9: 0
- 5.0–5.9: 1

Date	Country and location	M_{w}	Depth (km)	MMI	Notes	Casualties	
Date	Country and location	M_{w}	Depth (km)	MMI	Notes	Dead	Injured
8	Qing Dynasty, Sichuan	5.0	0.0	VI	13 people were killed and at least 1 was injured. Some damage was caused. Depth unknown.	13	1
8	Kingdom of Greece, Aegean Sea	7.4	15.0	X			

=== December ===
December
- Strongest: 7.1 M_{w} Mexico
- Deadliest: 6.8 M_{w} Ottoman Empire; 101 deaths
- Total fatalities: 101

Number by magnitude
- 8.0–8.9: 0
- 7.0–7.9: 1
- 6.0–6.9: 3

Date	Country and location	M_{w}	Depth (km)	MMI	Notes	Casualties	
Date	Country and location	M_{w}	Depth (km)	MMI	Notes	Dead	Injured
4	Ottoman Empire, Malatya Province	6.8	10.0	IX	At least 101 people were killed and major damage was caused.	101	
8	United States, Negros	6.5	0.0		Some damage was reported. Depth unknown.		
10	United States, Andreanof Islands	6.9	0.0		Depth unknown.		
17	Mexico, Revilla Gigedo Islands	7.1	0.0		Depth unknown.		
