= Cathy Simon =

American architect

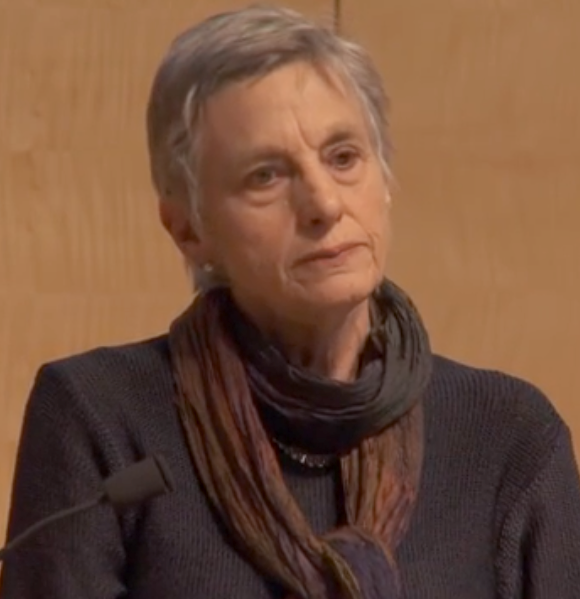
- In a panel discussion at the San Francisco Public Library in 2016
- Education: Wellesley College; Harvard Graduate School of Design
- Occupation: Architect

Cathy Simon is an American architect. She is known for her adaptive reuse and urban design projects, many of which are in the Bay area. She is currently a design principal at Perkins and Will. She was one of five founding partners of the influential female-owned firm SMWM (Simon Martin-Vegue Winkelstein Moris), based in San Francisco. She and Martin-Vengue have spent more than 18 years "building one of the nation's largest women-owned firms." She has worked on major projects including the conversion of the San Francisco Ferry building, the San Francisco Main Library, the renovation of PG&E's San Francisco headquarters, and the San Francisco Conservatory of Music.

== Significant projects ==
- Conservations and restoration of the San Francisco Ferry Building (SMWM)
- San Francisco Conservatory of Music (SMWM)
- San Francisco Main Library (SMWM and Pei Cobb Freed & Partners)
- Hearst Memorial Gym at University of California Berkeley (SMWM)
- Oceanside Water Pollution Control Plant (SMWM)
- The Metreon, an entertainment and shopping complex in San Francisco at Yerba Buena Gardens (SMWM and Handel Architects)
- Master plans for Stanford, Harvard, Brown, and NYU (SMWM)
- Heinz and Lilo Bertelsmann Campus Center, Bard College, Annandale-on-Hudson, New York (SMWM)
- Franklin W. Olin Humanities Building, Bard College, Annandale-on-Hudson, New York (SMWM and Wank Adams Slavin)
- Marin Academy Performing Art Center and Field House, San Rafael, California (SMWM)
- 140 New Montgomery (Perkins + Will)
- Primate Discovery Center, San Francisco Zoo (Marquis Associates)

== Awards ==
- American Institute of Steel Construction Award of Excellence of the Primate Discovery Center, 1985
- Excellence in Design Award / Restoration & Rehabilitation for the San Francisco Ferry Building, American Institute of Architect's San Francisco Design Awards, 2004
- EDRA/Places Award for Design for the San Francisco Ferry Building, 2007

== Education ==
Simon is a graduate of Wellesley College and Harvard University's Graduate School of Design.
