= 1957 San Francisco earthquake =

Earthquake in California, US

- UTC time: 1957-03-22 19:44:22
- ISC event: 886234
- USGS-ANSS: ComCat
- Local date: March 22, 1957; 69 years ago
- Local time: 11:44:22 PST
- Magnitude: 5.7 M_{w}
- Depth: 15 km (9.3 mi)
- Epicenter: 37.5572°N 122.7239°W
- Type: Oblique-slip
- Areas affected: San Francisco Bay Area; Northern California; United States
- Total damage: $1 million
- Max. intensity: MMI VII (Very strong)
- Peak acceleration: 0.18 g
- Landslides: Yes
- Casualties: 1 dead, 40 injured

The 1957 San Francisco earthquake (also known as the Daly City earthquake of 1957) occurred on March 22 at 11:44:22 local time with a moment magnitude of 5.7 and a maximum Mercalli Intensity of VII (Very strong). It was located just off the San Francisco Peninsula near the San Andreas Fault and was felt in a limited portion of Northern and Central California. There was a non-destructive foreshock and aftershock sequence that lasted for several months. With financial losses of around US$1 million, damage was considered minimal, with one death and forty injuries.

== Tectonic setting ==
The San Andreas Fault System (SAFS) is a collection of faults that accommodates differential motion between the Pacific and North American plates and extends from the Mendocino triple junction in the north to the Salton Sea in the south. While the majority of movement occurs as right-lateral strike-slip on the significant branches of the system, including the San Jacinto and Hayward faults that are relatively near the main San Andreas Fault, other types of faults (including left-lateral strike-slip, reverse, thrust, and to a lesser extent, normal) are also present. These various fault types have been observed well east into the Basin and Range Province.

== Earthquake ==
Eight foreshocks (with a maximum magnitude of 3.8) preceded the main event. The first motion method was used to determine the focal mechanism of the mainshock. It was found to be dissimilar from the strike-slip movement of the 1906 earthquake, and instead showed oblique movement on a steeply-dipping thrust fault, with the eastern side of the fault rising relative to the western side. The strike-slip component was minimal and was only about half as much as the thrust component.

=== Damage ===
Damage was non-structural and was limited to content within buildings and cracked plaster and was estimated at $1 million, not including loss to building content. The most significant effects were seen in the western portion of Daly City and in the Lake Merced area of San Francisco. The minimal losses were attributed to the short duration and lack of high intensity shaking.

=== Strong motion ===
The event was felt over an area of 12,000 square miles. Its scientific value was reinforced because it was captured on 13 strong motion instruments. A maximum (free field) peak ground acceleration of 0.13 g was recorded in Golden Gate Park and .18 g was recorded on the fourteenth floor of a building in San Francisco.

== See also ==
- List of earthquakes in 1957
- List of earthquakes in California
- List of earthquakes in the United States
