= 1957 Fethiye earthquakes =

Earthquakes in Turkey

1957 Fethiye earthquake
- UTC time: Doublet earthquake:
- A: 1957-04-24 19:10:13
- B: 1957-04-25 02:25:41
- ISC event
- A: 886445
- B: 886448
- USGS-ANSS
- A: ComCat
- B: ComCat
- Local date: April 24–25, 1957
- Magnitude
- A: 7.1 M_{w}
- B: 7.3 M_{w}
- Depth: 35.0 km (21.7 mi)
- Epicenter: 36.493°N 28.829°E; 36.405°N 28.699°E
- Areas affected: Turkey Fethiye, Muğla
- Max. intensity: MMI IX (Violent)
- Casualties: 19–67 dead

The first of the 1957 Fethiye earthquakes occurred on April 24, 1957, with the second and larger event about seven hours later on the following day. Both earthquakes had epicentres in the eastern Mediterranean between Rhodes and the coastal city of Fethiye in Muğla Province, southwestern Turkey.

== Tectonics ==
As noted by a scientist from Istanbul Technical University, the tectonics of the Aegean Region of Turkey, which incorporates many faults, produces earthquakes frequently. The quakes can reach magnitudes up to 7.2 with aftershocks of 5.1. A geological fault in the southern part of the region stretches from the Greek island of Rhodes northeastwards to Burdur and passes close to the vicinity to Fethiye.

== Earthquake characteristics ==
The first earthquake hit at 21:17 hours local time on April 24, 1957, and lasted 25 seconds having a magnitude of 7.1 on the moment magnitude scale; a stronger second quake occurred at 04:26 hours on April 25; this one lasted for 60 seconds and had a magnitude of 7.3. The earthquakes also shook many locations around Fethye, the epicenter, including Isparta, Burdur, Tefenni, Acıpayam, Denizli, Nazilli, Aydın, Yatağan, Milas, Bodrum, Ödemiş, Muğla, Marmaris, Köyceğiz, Kaş and Finike as well as the Greek islands of Kos, Symi and Rhodes.

== Damage and casualties ==
Around 1,500 structures, including public buildings such as schools, hospital, prison, gendarmerie station, community health center and city hall, were damaged. The number of affected people was around 8,000. A 5–6 m (16–20 ft) section of the harbor quay broke away and sank into the sea, and asphalt road surfaces split and cracked. The earthquake ruined almost the entire city, with 90% of buildings being damaged. Thanks to the strict evacuation order of the district governor Nazif Okuş after the first quake, the number of dead remained at only 19 for the city and the villages around with a total population of around 60,000. According to another source, a total of 67 people were killed, 27 in the city and in its villages, 40 in the surrounding districts.

Telecommunications were interrupted as the telephone lines broke, but communications were restored two days later by the use of field telephones.

== Aftermath ==
The first actual relief came on April 26 from the Turkish Red Crescent (Turkish: Kızılay) with 2,500 blankets, 1,350 tents and a field hospital. President Celal Bayar, Prime Minister Adnan Menderes and high government officials visited the disaster region on April 28. Wreck removal works were hampered by uninterrupted rainfall.

On April 29, the destroyer HMS Dainty, a warship of the British Mediterranean Fleet delivered 2,000 blankets, 500 tents, medicine and food to the earthquake victims in Fethiye.

== International search and rescue response ==
In the immediate aftermath of the twin earthquakes, the Turkish Red Crescent (Kızılay) initiated relief operations on April 26, providing 2,500 blankets, 1,350 tents, and establishing a field hospital to support the displaced population. The Turkish government, including President Celal Bayar and Prime Minister Adnan Menderes, visited the disaster area on April 28 to oversee relief efforts and assess the damage.

== Commemoration ==
In 2013, the mayor of Fethiye held a commemoration event featuring a photography exhibition.
