= Bingöl earthquake =

Bingöl earthquake may refer to:

- 1866 Bingöl earthquake
- 1971 Bingöl earthquake
- 2003 Bingöl earthquake
- 2020 Bingöl earthquake
