= 1866 Bingöl earthquake =

Earthquake in Turkey

- Location within Turkey
- Local date: 12 May 1866
- Local time: Late afternoon
- Magnitude: M_{s} 7.2
- Epicenter: 39.2°N 41.0°E
- Areas affected: Turkey
- Max. intensity: MSK-64 IX (Destructive)
- Casualties: >680 fatalities

The 1866 Bingöl earthquake struck the Ottoman Empire on 12 May. It had an estimated surface-wave magnitude of 7.2 and was associated with faulting along the East Anatolian Fault. The earthquake resulted in over 680 fatalities and the destruction of thousands of homes in Bingöl Province.

== Tectonic setting ==
The East Anatolian Fault, a 700-kilometre-long (430 mi) northeast–southwest left-lateral transform fault, represents the boundary between the Anatolian and Arabian plates. The fault displays slip rates that decrease from the east at 10 mm (0.39 in) per year to the west, where it is 1–4 mm (0.039–0.157 in) per year. It was associated with large earthquakes in 1789 (M 7.2), 1795 (M 7.0), 1872 (M 7.2), 1874 (M 7.1), 1875 (M 6.7), 1893 (M 7.1), and 2020 (M_{w}6.8). These earthquakes ruptured individual segments of the fault. This intracontinental transform fault is the second-largest strike-slip fault in Turkey. The northeastern segment is known as the Karlıova Segment, which has not produced a major earthquake since 1866. An adjacent segment to the southwest ruptured in the 1971 Bingöl earthquake.

== Earthquake ==
The estimated surface-wave magnitude was 7.2, with a maximum MSK-64 intensity of IX (Destructive) assigned to areas with heavy damage and surface rupture. Surface ruptures were observed in the Göynük Valley, extending south from Halipan village to the Varto district in the north for an estimated 45 km (28 mi). The earthquake was associated with rupture along the northeastern East Anatolian Fault and occurred at the Karlıova triple junction where it meets the North Anatolian Fault. The entire 34 km (21 mi) of the Karlıova Segment and 10 km (6.2 mi) of the Ilıca Segment were associated with the earthquake. Surface offsets were estimated at 3.5 ± 0.1 m (11.48 ± 0.33 ft).

== Impact ==
The Russian consul in Erzurum documented the earthquake's effects, reporting heavy damage along the Göynuk Valley—extending from Çobantaşı in the southwest to Karlıova in the northeast. The French consul of Erzurum also visited the area, documenting severe damage in the districts of Kiğı, Capakcur, and areas further south.

In the eastern part of Kiğı District, most villages were nearly flattened. At least 1,106 homes were destroyed, and 470 people died in Kiğı District's Göynuk township. In Kurtyuzu township, 100 people died, and 448 homes were razed. In Capakcur District, there were 20 deaths and 200 homes destroyed. At Hromek township, Varto District, 483 homes were ruined or badly damaged. At Asagi Varto, 90 people died, and 136 homes were partly or totally destroyed. An unspecified number of Zazas also died in the Simsor area.

Shaking was felt in Muş and Hınıs. In Erzurum, some chimneys fell, and one house collapsed. Along the hillside, some homes were damaged, causing widespread panic across the town. Shaking was also felt hundreds of kilometers away in Erzincan, Ordu, and Diyarbakır. Minor damage and cracks in plaster walls were observed in Diyarbakır.

== See also ==
- List of earthquakes in Turkey
