= 1986 Malatya earthquake =

Earthquake in Turkey

- Location within Turkey
- UTC time: 1986-05-05 03:35:38
- ISC event: 494730
- USGS-ANSS: ComCat
- Local date: 5 May 1986
- Local time: 06:35:38 TRT
- Magnitude: 6.1 M_{w}
- Depth: 9.6 km (6.0 mi)
- Epicenter: 37.993°N 37.806°E
- Type: Strike-slip
- Areas affected: Turkey
- Max. intensity: MMI VIII (Severe)
- Peak acceleration: 0.056 g
- Aftershocks: 5.8 M_{w}
- Casualties: 15 dead, 100 injured

The 1986 Malatya earthquake was a moment magnitude (M_{w}) 6.1 earthquake that occurred in the early morning hours of May 5, 1986. The shaking reached a maximum Modified Mercalli Intensity of VIII (Severe). It occurred near the city of Malatya, Turkey.

== Tectonic setting ==
Most of Turkey sits on the Anatolian Plate, which is being forced westwards by the collision between the Arabian Plate and the Eurasian Plate This westward movement is accommodated by two large strike-slip fault zones, the west-east trending right lateral North Anatolian Fault in the north of the country and the SW-NE trending left lateral East Anatolian Fault towards the south-east. Movement on these two faults has been responsible for many large and damaging earthquakes historically. Recent major earthquakes on the East Anatolian Fault include the 2003 Bingöl earthquake, the 2010 Elâzığ earthquake, the 2020 Elazig earthquake and the 2023 Turkey-Syria earthquakes.

== Earthquake ==
The M_{w} 6.1 earthquake struck near the city of Malatya, Turkey at 06:35 TRT on May 5. It occurred at a shallow depth of 9.6 km (6.0 mi). The focal mechanism of the earthquake indicates strike slip faulting with a strike in agreement with rupture along the East Anatolian Fault. The amount of aftershocks that occurred were small, but a noteworthy M_{w} 5.8 earthquake rocked the same area only a month later. The mainshock occurred along a section of the East Anatolian Fault which meets the Bitlis Thrust Zone. The left-lateral Sürgü Fault may have been associated with the event due to its proximity to the epicenter.

== Damage ==
The mainshock killed 15 people and injured a hundred more. Dozens of houses were reportedly damaged. The worst hit town was Doğanşehir, where 13 people were killed and 100 houses collapsed. In the neighboring town of Gölbaşı, the quake took two more lives, destroyed the town's mosque, and caused schools to be closed. At the nearby Sürgü Dam, 10 kilometers to the northeast, very strong shaking caused cracks to appear in the dam. The largest of the cracks was up to 150 meters in length, 20 centimeters in width, and 3 meters deep. A strong aftershock on June 6 caused an additional fatality and four more injuries.

== See also ==
- List of earthquakes in 1986
- List of earthquakes in Turkey
- 2023 Turkey–Syria earthquakes
