= 1971 earthquake =

1971 earthquake may refer to:

- 1971 Bingöl earthquake (Turkey)
- 1971 San Fernando earthquake (Los Angeles, California, US), also known as the "Sylmar earthquake"
- 1971 Solomon Islands earthquakes (great doublet, tsunami)
