= 1893 Malatya earthquake =

Earthquake in Turkey

- Location within Turkey
- Local date: 3 March 1893
- Local time: 02:30
- Magnitude: M_{s} 7.1
- Epicenter: 38.154°N 38.293°E
- Areas affected: Turkey
- Max. intensity: MMI X (Extreme)
- Casualties: 885 fatalities

The 1893 Malatya earthquake occurred at 02:30 local time on 3 March in Malatya, Eastern Anatolia region of Turkey. It had a surface wave magnitude of 7.1 and maximum felt intensity of X (Extreme) on the Mercalli intensity scale. This destructive earthquake caused 885 deaths and 164 injuries.

== Tectonic setting ==
The earthquake was located near the East Anatolian Fault; a 700-kilometre-long (430 mi) northeast–southwest left-lateral transform fault representing the boundary between the Anatolian and Arabian plates. The fault displays slip rates that decrease from the east at 10 mm (0.39 in) per year to the west, where it is 1–4 mm (0.039–0.157 in) per year. The fault produced large earthquakes in 1789 (M 7.2), 1795 (M 7.0), 1872 (M 7.2), 1874 (M 7.1), 1875 (M 6.7), 1893 (M 7.1), and 2020 (M_{w}6.8). These earthquakes ruptured individual segments of the fault. The seismically active Palu and Pütürge segments in the east display a recurrence interval of about 150 years for M 6.8–7.0 earthquakes. The Pazarcık and Amanos segments in the west have recurrence intervals of 237–772 years and 414–917 years, respectively, for M 7.0–7.4 earthquakes. This intracontinental transform fault is the second largest strike-slip fault in Turkey.

== Earthquake ==
The shock had a surface wave magnitude of 7.1 and was assigned a maximum intensity of X (Extreme) on the Mercalli intensity scale. was part of a seismic sequence involving M_{w} 6.7–7.0 earthquakes along the East Anatolian Fault from 1866 to 1905. It ruptured the Erkenek segment of the fault southwest of Lake Hazar. The Erkenek segment is located between the Pütürge segment to the northeast and the Pazarcık segment in the southwest. The shock was associated with 86 km (53 mi) of surface rupture with a maximum left-lateral offset of 4.5 m (15 ft) measured south of Çelikhan. The damage area measured 220 km (140 mi) long by 120 km (75 mi) wide. Rupture was confined to the Erkenek segment; which was broken for most of its length. The rupture likely ceased about 20 km (12 mi) southwest of Pütürge in the north and near Erkenek at its southern termination. A M_{w} 6.8 earthquake in 1905 likely completed the rupture along the southern Erkenek segment; no surface faulting was associated with the shock. The Erkenek and Pazarcık segments ruptured during the M_{w} 7.8 earthquake on 6 February 2023 while the Pütürge segment ruptured during the M_{w} 6.8 earthquake on 24 January 2020.

== Impact ==
The shock affected a 220 km (140 mi) long by 120 km (75 mi) wide area that encompassed the districts of Kubeli, Behesni, Hisn-Mansur, Akcedağ, Karakiahta and Mirdis. A total of 885 people died and 164 were injured. In Akcedağ, 2,719 of its 11,740 homes were totally destroyed, 1,345 were uninhabitable and 2,195 were damaged. An estimated 5,100 homes in the villages between Malatya and Pütürge were destroyed; the remaining 1,900 were damaged. In these villages, 42 marketplaces, two mosques, a church and school were also destroyed. The death toll in the villages stood at 285 and 77 were injured. At least 3,260 sheep and 226 cattle also died. In Adıyaman, 22 died and 26 were injured; a third of its 3,500 homes were razed; another third were damaged. Eight villages near Malatya were demolished and 124 deaths were reported. In Malatya, homes were damaged though few collapsed; about 300 people died. Three churches, 47 mosques, 14 religious schools, the barracks in the town and two telegraph stations were razed. Some homes and government buildings in Elbistan and Gaziantep were destroyed. Aftershocks which were felt until 12 March caused further damage. A cholera outbreak the same year killed 896 people. The reconstruction of demolished buildings began in 1894.

== See also ==
- List of historical earthquakes
- List of earthquakes in Turkey
