= Sürgü Fault =

Sürgü Fault Zone
- Location: Eastern and south-central Turkey
- Country: Turkey

Tectonics
- Plate: Anatolian Plate
- Earthquakes: 1544; 1986 Malatya earthquake 2023 Kahramanmaraş earthquake

The Sürgü Fault Zone (Sürgü Fay Zonu) is a major fault zone in south-central Anatolia. It contains the Sürgü fault. Rupture on this fault caused the second major (M>7) earthquake during the 2023 Gaziantep-Kahramanmaraş earthquakes that started in February 2023.

The fault zone extends (west to east) from Göksun to Çelikhan where it merges into the East Anatolian Fault. It is a "major fault recognized in the field" of geosciences and "was known to be capable of very significant earthquakes" such as in 1544 and 1986. As of 2023 it has been estimated to have an activated length of about 300 kilometres (300,000 m).

During the 2023 Gaziantep-Kahramanmaraş earthquakes, the Sürgü Fault experienced a major earthquake of M_{w} 7.6, which was followed by many aftershocks along the active length of the faultline.

== Sources ==
- Govers, Rob (14 February 2023). "The science behind an earthquake". Utrecht: Utrecht University – via YouTube. ORCID 0000-0001-7148-8857
- "Hekimhan'daki 5.1 büyüklüğündeki deprem Sürgü Fayı üzerinde mi oldu?". Yeni Şafak (in Turkish). 13 February 2023.
- Koç, Ayten; Kaymakcı, Nuretdin (April 2013). "Kinematics of Sürgü Fault Zone (Malatya, Turkey): A remote sensing study". Journal of Geodynamics. 65 (65). Elsevier: 292–307. Bibcode:2013JGeo...65..292K. doi:10.1016/j.jog.2012.08.001. hdl:11511/47739.
- Palutoğlu, Mahmut; Şaşmaz, Ahmet (2017). "29 Kasim 1795 Kahramanmaraş Depremi, Güney Türkiye" [29 November 1795 Kahramanmaraş Earthquake, Southern Turkey] (PDF). Maden Tetkik ve Arama Dergisi (Research Paper) (in Turkish) (155). Ankara: Maden Tetkik ve Arama: 191–206. ISSN 0026-4563.
