= 1872 Amik earthquake =

Earthquake in the Ottoman Empire

1872 Antioch earthquake
- Location within Turkey Location within Syria
- Local date: 3 April 1872
- Magnitude: 7.2 M_{s}
- Epicenter: 36.4°N 36.4°E
- Type: Strike-slip
- Areas affected: Turkey and Syria
- Max. intensity: MSK-64 XI (Catastrophic)
- Casualties: 1,800 dead

The 1872 Amik (Antakya) earthquake occurred on April 3 with an epicenter within the Amik Valley in the Ottoman Empire. Earthquake had an estimated magnitude of M_{w} 7.0–7.2 or M_{s} 7.2 and maximum MSK 64 rating of XI (Catastrophic). Turkey and Syria were devastated by this earthquake, and the region lost at least 1,800 residents.

== Tectonic setting ==
The Amik Valley lies along the Dead Sea Transform Fault system; a predominantly strike-slip plate boundary between the African and Arabian tectonic plates. This ~1,000 km-long left-lateral transform fault connects the Red Sea spreading center in the south to the Maraş triple junction in the north. At the Maraş triple junction, the Dead Sea transform fault is one of two arms of the triple junction. Two other plate boundaries; the Cyprus arc, and East Anatolian Fault meet at this triple junction. Due to its location at an active and complex plate boundary, Antioch suffers from devastating earthquakes, including one in 115 AD that killed over 200,000 people.

== Earthquake ==
The suggested epicenter may have been south from that of the 1822 Aleppo earthquake. Nicholas Ambraseys, a Greek seismologist, estimated the surface-wave magnitude at 7.2 M_{s}. Estimates of the moment magnitude (M_{w}) range from 7.0 to 7.2. A buried surface rupture along the northernmost strand of the Dead Sea Transform beneath the Amik Basin may correspond with the 1872 event. The distribution of damage around Amik Lake suggest a north–south trending fault rupture. No evidence of the 1872 earthquake were found along the southern part of the southern Hacıpaşa Fault, the northernmost segment of the Dead Sea Transform, suggesting the rupture did not extend south towards the Al-Ghab Plain and was only a partial rupture. It implies the southern Hacıpaşa Fault may have last ruptured in another earthquake in 1408, and with the absence of large earthquakes since then, large amounts of slip has accumulated. An isoseismal map of the earthquake suggest rupture occurred at the southern tip of the Amanos Fault and extended to the coast of Samandağ via the Antakya Fault Zone.

== Impact ==
MSK 64 by location
MSK 64	Locations
MSK-64 VIII (Damaging)–MSK-64 XI (Catastrophic)	Harem, Samandağ, Armanaz
MSK-64 VI (Strong)–MSK-64 VII (Very strong)	Antioch, Aleppo, İskenderun
MSK-64 IV (Largely observed)–MSK-64 V (Fairly strong)	Hama, Tripoli, Lebanon

Extreme damage was reported around the now drained Lake Amik. The worst damage occurred in the Kumlu district in Hatay Province. The towns of Samandağ, Fatikli and Altınözü suffered great devastation. An estimated 1,800 people were killed. A maximum intensity of XI (Catastrophic) was assigned in Samandağ.

Approximately 40 seconds of extreme shaking was sufficient to destroy 1,960 of the 3,003 homes and kill 500 residents. A further 894 homes suffered serious damage. More than 5,000 commercial buildings were destroyed with only a few hundred left intact. A Greek cathedral and American Protestant church collapsed, killing four. City gates fell to the ground.

At least 38 villages outside the city were obliterated. In Suaidya, 2,150 homes collapsed and 300 people died. At least 170 were killed, 187 others were injured and 3,552 homes were destroyed in Qaramut. Another 300 people died in Qilliq and the town was completely destroyed. The ground at Qilliq fissured and erupted yellow sand during liquefaction. Along the eastern slopes of the Amik Valley, the ground was displaced and surface ruptures ripped through the valley.

In Aleppo, an estimated 100 houses collapsed or were damaged. Seven residents lost their lives and three were injured. Many bridges also suffered damage. The earthquake was felt in Beirut, Rhodes, and Damascus. Shaking was not felt in Egypt, but over a wide area from Rhodes to Diyarbakir and from Konya to Gaza.

Along the coast of southern Turkey, a tsunami was reported, flooding the coast of Suaidiya. The tsunami reported inundated 2 km inland. In a 2003 study, tsunami experts from Tohoku University, Middle East Technical University and the National Observatory of Athens found a tsunami deposit that corresponded to 1872.

== See also ==
- List of earthquakes in the Levant
- List of earthquakes in Turkey
