= East Anatolian Fault =

Geological fault between the Anatolian and Arabian plates

- The East Anatolian and neighbouring faults cover most of Turkey
- Location: Eastern and south-central Turkey
- Country: Turkey

Tectonics
- Plate: Anatolian plate Arabian plate
- Earthquakes: 1866, 1893, 1998, 2010, 2020, 2023
- Type: strike-slip, transform-type tectonic boundary

The East Anatolian Fault (EAF; Turkish: Doğu Anadolu Fay Hattı) is a ~700 km long major strike-slip fault zone running from eastern to south-central Turkey. It forms the transform type tectonic boundary between the Anatolian sub-plate and the northward-moving Arabian plate. The difference in the relative motions of the two plates is manifest in the left lateral motion along the fault. The East and North Anatolian faults together accommodate the westward motion of the Anatolian sub-plate as it is squeezed out by the ongoing collision between the Arabian plate and the Eurasian plate.

The East Anatolian Fault runs in a northeasterly direction, starting from the Maraş triple junction at the northern end of the Dead Sea Transform, and ending at the Karlıova triple junction where it meets the North Anatolian Fault. Another 350 km (220 mi) strand of the fault exists north of the main strand known as the Sürgü–Misis Fault System.

== Discovery ==
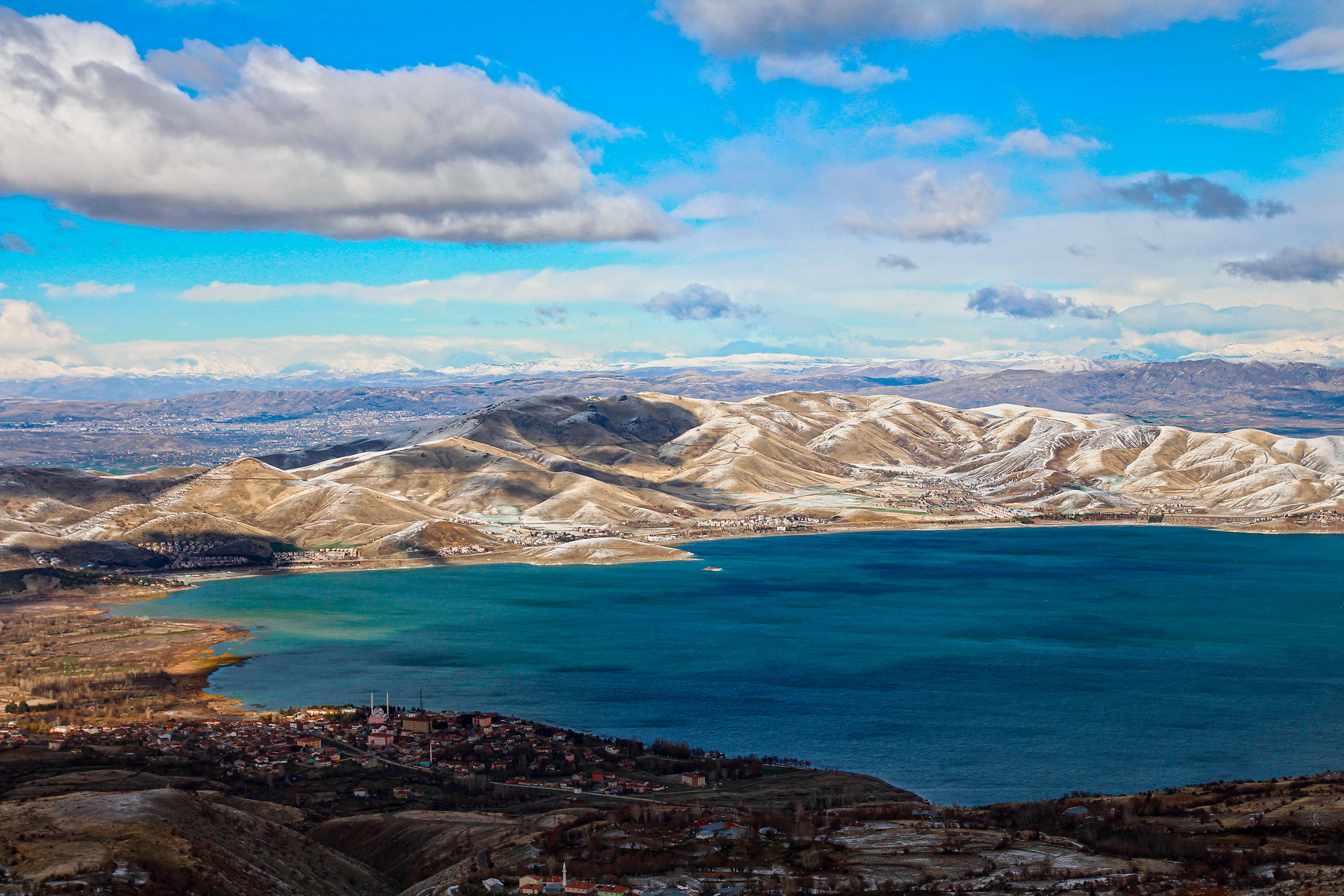
Lake Hazar represents a sag pond on the East Anatolian Fault

In 1963, geologists published descriptions about a fault structure near Karlıova where the North Anatolian Fault terminates. In their findings, based on geomorphology, they described a fault extending over 70 km (43 mi) southwest from Karlıova to Bingöl. The fault to its southwest was not described. Geologist Clarence Allen explained in his 1969 journal, regarding the abrupt termination of the North Anatolian Fault east of Karlıova, that a southwest-striking fault also terminated within the same area. He identified fault-related features such as linear valleys, sag ponds and scarps from Palu to Lake Hazar; fault scarps of Quaternary age were discovered along Lake Hazar's shores. He calculated that this fault structure would intersect the left-lateral Dead Sea Transform if it continued along its southwest trend, and suspected it also had a left-lateral slip sense.

Significant attention to this structure arose following an earthquake in Bingöl on 22 May 1971. Ground cracks associated with the earthquake exhibited a dominant left-lateral component that aligned with the trend of valleys associated with the fault. This discovery supported the theory of a mainly left-lateral mechanism for the East Anatolian Fault. This mechanism and trend is also consistent with north–south convergence acting as the predominant tectonic regime.

In 1976, Dan McKenzie described the fault in the journal Earth and Planetary Science Letters; a 550 km (340 mi) strike-slip fault extending from the Gulf of Alexandretta to the North Anatolian Fault. The description of its southern end contradicts that of Allen. McKenzie also stated that the fault represented a boundary between the Anatolian and Arabian plates.

== Main (Southern) strand ==
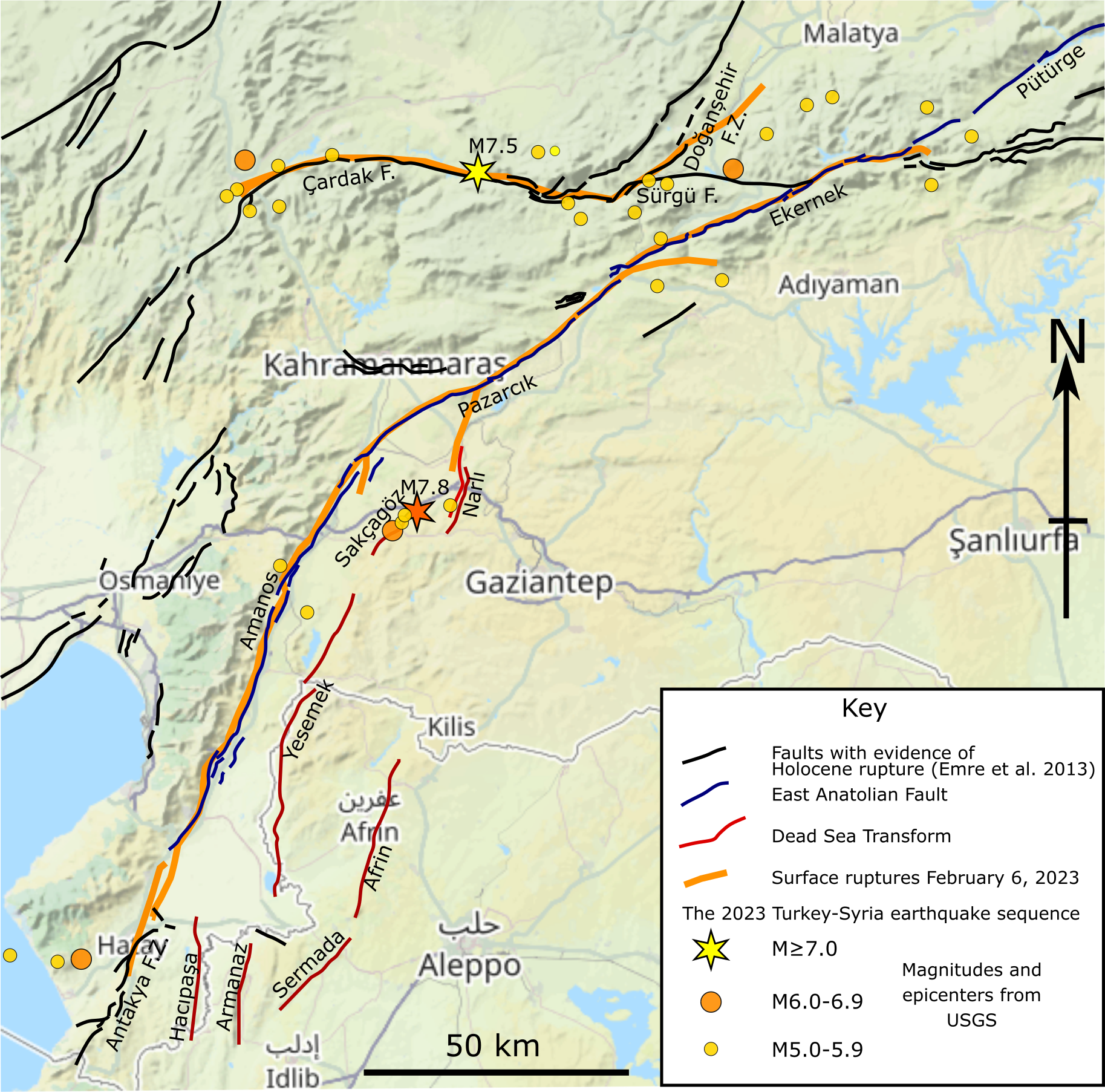
Orange line traces the rupture along the East Anatolian Fault during the earthquakes of 6 February 2023

The northeast–southwest trending main strand runs for 580 km (360 mi) from Karlıova in the north to Antakya in the south.

=== Karlıova segment ===
The Karlıova segment represents the northeasternmost trace of the East Anatolian Fault and extends 25 km (16 mi) from the triple junction to Göynük. Its morphology is characterized by young scarps; streams offset from several to hundreds of meters; pressure ridges; linear valleys and hot springs. A 3.5 m (11 ft) offset located 1 km (0.62 mi) southeast of Boncukgöze could be associated with the 1866 Bingöl earthquake (M_{w} 7.1) surface rupture. This segment has not experienced a major earthquake since 1866. The segment terminates at the Göynük restraining bend connecting the Ilıca segment.

=== Ilıca segment ===
This segment runs through mountainous terrain from the Göynük restraining bend to Ilıca along a single branch. It traverses through Palaeozoic strata and volcanic-sedimentary strata from the Mio-Pliocene and Quaternary. Previous studies of the East Anatolian Fault consider it part of the Karlıova segment rather than an independent segment. The 1971 Bingöl earthquake (M_{s} 6.8) produced 35 km (22 mi) of surface faulting on this segment, but did not extend beyond northeast of Göynük.

=== Palu segment ===
This segment extends between Lake Hazar and Palu for 77 km (48 mi). The northern part of the Palu segment was associated with a M_{w} 6.1 earthquake on 8 March 2010. Young scarps and offsets measuring 2.5–4 m (8 ft 2 in – 13 ft 1 in) were observed. The last major earthquake occurred on 3 May 1874, estimated at M_{w} 7.1. East of Lake Hazar, a 2.6 m (8 ft 6 in) offset was reported; the average offset associated with the event along the central part was 3.5 + 0.5 m (11.5 + 1.6 ft).

=== Pütürge segment ===
The area where the Pütürge segment runs through is mountainous and characterized by Paleozoic-Mesozoic metamorphic and Mesozoic ophiolite mélange and clastic rocks. Measurements of basement rocks and offsets along the Euphrates revealed geologic offsets of 9–22 km (5.6–13.7 mi). Although there are Holocene scarps, the precise date when they formed is unknown. Earthquakes in 1875 and 1905 may have occurred on the Pütürge segment. This segment was associated with a ~45 km (28 mi) rupture during the January 2020 M_{w} 6.7 earthquake.

=== Erkenek segment ===
This segment runs from Yarpuzlu to Gölbaşı. The cumulative offset along the Erkenek segment is 26–22.5 km (16.2–14.0 mi). Stream channels crossing the fault were observed to have been offset by several meters to 0.5 km (0.31 mi). Recent seismic activity was inferred by the presence of young fault scarps. In 1893, a M_{s} 7.2 earthquake produced a 4.5 m (15 ft) offset near Çelikhan. The northern part of the Erkenek segment produced 10 km (6.2 mi) of surface rupture during the M_{w} 7.8 earthquake of 2023.

=== Pazarcık segment ===
The trace of the Pazarcık segment is reminiscent of a smooth sine curve; its northern half is concave while the southern half is also concave. This segment extends from Gölbaşı to Türkoğlu. Its cumulative geologic offset has been estimated at 19–25 km (12–16 mi); based on paleoseismological studies, the slip rate in the Holocene was estimated at 9 mm (0.35 in) per year. About 4 km (2.5 mi) southeast of Elmalar, 5 ± 0.2 m (16.40 ± 0.66 ft) of offset was reported along a stream, possibly associated with an earthquake in 1513. The Pazarcık segment may have also produced surface ruptures during the 1114 earthquake. This was one of the segments that ruptured during the M_{w} 7.8 earthquake of 2023.

=== Amanos segment ===
The Amanos segment, also known as the Karasu segment, measures 120 km (75 mi) in length and represents the southern part of the East Anatolian Fault. However, some geologists also consider this segment a continuation of the Dead Sea Fault, or a transition fault between the East Anatolian and Dead Sea Transform faults. Its southernmost trace ends at the Amik Basin where it meets the Hacıpaşa Fault (part of the Dead Sea Transform) and Cyprus Arc Fault at a triple junction. The M_{w} 7.2 earthquake of 1872 likely ruptured the southern portion of the Amanos segment. The Amanos segment also ruptured during the M_{w} 7.8 earthquake in 2023. It was followed two weeks later by a M_{w} 6.4 aftershock at its southernmost tip.

== Northern strand ==
The East Anatolian Fault branches away from the main strand to form a northern strand near Çelikhan. This strand, also known as the Sürgü–Misis Fault System, also consists multiple left-lateral fault segments with a total length of 380 km (240 mi). It joins the Kyrenia–Misis Fault Zone under the Gulf of Alexandretta.

=== Sürgü segment ===
This segment comprises a 17 km (11 mi)-long by 1 km (0.62 mi)-wide shutter ridge at its eastern portion before continuing west for 20 km (12 mi). The westernmost length consists two parallel fault strands which eventually integrate at Nurhak. A Holocene surface rupture through Holocene alluvial fan is evidence of a recent large earthquake. No surface rupturing occurred when the segment produced a M_{s} 5.8 earthquake in 1986.

=== Çardak segment ===
The Çardak segment between Nurhak and Göksun is 85 km (53 mi) in length and separated into two sections by a right stepover. Prior to 2023, the only known historical earthquake on this fault occurred in 1544, estimated at M_{uk} 6.8. Nine hours after the M_{w} 7.8 earthquake on 6 February 2023, a M_{w} 7.6 earthquake ruptured the Sürgü and Çardak segments. It produced 98 km (61 mi) of surface rupture and displayed a maximum surface offset of 10.0–12.6 m (32.8–41.3 ft); one of the largest surface offset ever observed from an earthquake.

=== Savrun segment ===
The northeast–southwest striking Savrun segment connects the western Çardak segment via a restraining bend at Göksun. It can be traced southwest to Sumbas. At Çiğşar, the fault is divided into two via a right stepover. The 20 km (12 mi) northern half is characterized by scarps ranging in height of 0.5–5 m (1 ft 8 in – 16 ft 5 in). Gullies were observed to be displaced by 5 m (16 ft). The southern half measures 41 km (25 mi) long and exhibits Holocene fault scarps along some portions.

=== Çokak segment ===
A left stepover separates the Çokak segment from the Savrun segment. The main strand strikes approximately northeast–southwest; its northern end consisting of a normal fault while the remaining, a left-lateral fault. Another left-lateral fault runs subparallel to the west along its southern half. It accumulated a total offset of 2.5 km (1.6 mi) during the Late Pliocene to Quaternary.

=== Toprakkale segment ===
The 50 km (31 mi)-long Toprakkale segment extends from Boynuyoğunlu to the Delihalil volcano. The fault segment in the south around Toprakkale is characterized by small volcanic cones. The fault displays 2–5 m (6 ft 7 in – 16 ft 5 in) of normal scarps cutting through the Quaternary basalt. It runs 12 km (7.5 mi) along a river valley carved by the Ceyhan River; some Holocene streams have been offset by 20–30 m (66–98 ft).

=== Düziçi–İskenderun segment ===
The Düziçi–İskenderun segment are a series of normal faults trending northwest and east of the Toprakkale segment. This segment represents the western border of the Amanos Mountains. The total vertical offset at Erzin is 80–90 m (260–300 ft).

=== Yakapınar segment ===
The Yakapınar segment runs from the mountainous area in the north to south in the Ceyhan plain. This northeast-striking left-lateral fault was the source of the 1998 Adana–Ceyhan earthquake (M_{w} 6.2). Two other earthquakes in 1945 (M_{w} 6.0) and 1266 (M_{w} 6.3) occurred on this fault.

=== Yumurtalık segment ===
This segment runs parallel to the northern shores of the Gulf of Alexandretta. This segment consists of two eastern and western sections measuring 16.5 km (10.3 mi) and 24.5 km (15.2 mi), respectively.

=== Karataş segment ===
The Karataş segment runs for 64 km (40 mi) and is subparallel to the Yumurtalık segment but located north of that segment.

== Seismicity ==
The fault produced large earthquakes in 1789 (M 7.2), 1795 (M 7.0), 1872 (M 7.2), 1874 (M 7.1), 1875 (M 6.7), 1893 (M 7.1) and 1905 (M_{w} 6.8). The M_{s}7.1 earthquake in 1893 killed over 800 people. In 1866, a M_{s} 7.2 earthquake ruptured a segment of the fault that meets the Karlıova triple junction.

Since 1998, there has been a series of earthquakes on or near the East Anatolian Fault. These started with the 1998 Adana–Ceyhan earthquake and include the 2003 Bingöl earthquake, the 2010 Elâzığ earthquake, the 2020 Elâzığ earthquake and the 2023 Turkey–Syria earthquakes. The 2003 earthquake did not rupture along the East Anatolian Fault; it ruptured a perpendicular strike-slip fault. The 1971 Bingöl earthquake produced surface ruptures along the fault. The 2023 earthquake produced up to 400 km (250 mi) of surface rupture along the fault.
