= 2020 Bingöl earthquake =

Earthquake in Turkey

- Location within Turkey
- UTC time: 2020-06-14 14:24:26
- ISC event: 618541936
- USGS-ANSS: ComCat
- Local date: 14 June 2020
- Local time: 17:24 TRT (UTC+3:00)
- Magnitude: 5.8 M_{w}
- Depth: 5 km (3 mi)
- Epicenter: Kaynarpınar, Karlıova, Bingöl; 39.350°N 40.735°E
- Type: Strike-slip
- Areas affected: Turkey
- Max. intensity: MMI VII (Very strong)
- Casualties: 1 fatality, 21 injuries

The 2020 Bingöl earthquake occurred at 17:24 local time (14:24 UTC) on 14 June in Bingöl, Turkey. The magnitude of the earthquake was determined to be 5.8 M_{w}. The earthquake's epicentre was close to the Kaynarpınar village in Karlıova, Bingöl and felt in the neighbouring provinces of Erzurum, Diyarbakır, Elazığ and Muş. 392 aftershocks were detected following the earthquake, with the largest being a 5.5 M_{w} event.

== Damage ==
The earthquake caused damage in Kaynarpınar village of Karlıova and Elmalı and Dinarbey villages of Yedisu. 10 houses in Elmalı and Dinarbey collapsed and injured 21 people while a police station in Kaynarpınar collapsed killing 1 village guard.

== See also ==
- 2020 Elazığ earthquake
- 2020 Iran-Turkey earthquakes
- List of Earthquakes in Turkey
- List of earthquakes in 2020
