= List of earthquakes in 1986 =

Earthquakes in 1986
Approximate epicenters of the earthquakes in 1986
- 4.0–5.9 magnitude
- 6.0–6.9 magnitude
- 7.0–7.9 magnitude
- 8.0+ magnitude
- Strongest magnitude: 8.0 M_{w} United States
- Deadliest: 5.7 M_{w} (El Salvador) El Salvador; 1,000 deaths
- Total fatalities: 1,240

Number by magnitude
- 9.0+: 0

This is a list of earthquakes in 1986. Only earthquakes of magnitude 6 or above are included, unless they result in damage or casualties, or are notable for some other reason. All dates are listed according to UTC time.

== By death toll ==
Rank	Death toll	Magnitude	Location	MMI	Depth (km)	Date
1	1,000	5.7	El Salvador, San Salvador	IX (Violent)	10.0	October 10
2	150	7.2	Romania, Vrancea	VIII (Severe)	131.0	August 30
3	20	6.0	Greece, Peloponnese	X (Extreme)	11.2	September 13
4	16	5.2	Peru, Cusco	IV (Light)	50.9	April 5
5	15	7.4	Taiwan, Hualien	VIII (Severe)	33.8	November 14
5	15	6.1	Turkey, Malatya	VIII (Severe)	9.6	May 5

== By magnitude ==
Rank	Magnitude	Death toll	Location	MMI	Depth (km)	Date
1	8.0	0	United States, Alaska offshore	VI (Strong)	33.0	May 7
2	7.7	0	New Zealand, Kermadec Islands offshore	I (Not felt)	29.1	October 20
3	7.5	0	Indonesia, Molucca Sea offshore	IV (Light)	33.0	August 14
4	7.4	15	Taiwan, Hualien offshore	VIII (Severe)	33.8	November 14
5	7.2	0	Tonga, Tongatapu offshore	V (Moderate)	188.1	October 30
5	7.2	150	Romania, Vrancea	VIII (Severe)	131.0	August 30
5	7.2	0	Papua New Guinea, East Sepik	VII (Very strong)	102.3	June 24
8	7.1	0	Tonga offshore	II (Weak)	547.0	June 16
8	7.1	0	Fiji, Central offshore	IV (Light)	538.3	May 26
8	7.1	0	Vanuatu, Tafea offshore	IV (Light)	150.0	January 15
11	7.0	0	Mexico, Michoacan offshore	V (Moderate)	26.5	April 30

== By month ==
=== January ===
January
- Strongest magnitude: 7.1 M_{w} Vanuatu
- Deadliest: 5.1 M_{w} Peru; 1 death
- Total fatalities: 1

Number by magnitude
- 8.0–8.9: 0
- 7.0–7.9: 1
- 6.0–6.9: 6

Date	Country and location	M_{w}	Depth (km)	MMI	Notes	Casualties	
Date	Country and location	M_{w}	Depth (km)	MMI	Notes	Dead	Injured
3	Indonesia, North Maluku offshore	6.1	39.1	V	-	-	-
11	Peru, Ancash	5.1	38.9	IV	One person died, about 80 houses damaged or destroyed, and about 100 people were made homeless in Huarmey. 40 animals were also killed by rockslides.	1	-
15	Vanuatu, Tafea offshore	6.0	146.3	I	It is a foreshock of the 7.0 quake a few seconds later.	-	-
15	Vanuatu, Tafea offshore	7.0	150.0	IV	-	-	-
16	Taiwan, Yilan offshore	6.0	12.6	VI	Four people were injured.	-	4
17	East Germany, Saxony	4.3	10.0	VI	Slight damage was caused in Selb.	-	-
22	Solomon Islands, Makira offshore	6.3	94.6	V	-	-	-
26	United States, California	5.5	8.2	VII	Some damage was caused in the Hollister-Tres Pinos-Paicines area and in the Santa Ana Valley east of Hollister. The most serious damage occurred at the Cienega Winery about 11 miles south of Hollister.	-	-
27	Solomon Islands, Makira offshore	6.0	82.2	V	-	-	-
27	Soviet Union, Azerbaijan Soviet Socialist Republic	5.3	71.2	VII	Damage was observed in Dzhalilabad.	-	-
28	India, Andaman and Nicobar Islands offshore	6.0	27.0	I	-	-	-
29	Indonesia, South Sumatra	5.0	33.0	IV	Two people were injured and severe damage occurred in Lahat.	-	2
31	United States, Ohio	5.0	10.0	VI	17 people were injured and slight damage occurred in the Painesville-Mentor area. Minor damage also occurred at Bainbridge, Bowling Green, Chardon, Geneva, Huntsburg, Kirtland, Leroy, Madison, Metals Park, Middlefield, Perry, Perry Nuclear Plant, Thompson, Warren and Willoughby. Minor damage also occurred in neighboring Pennsylvania, in Albion and Linesville.	-	17

=== February ===
February
- Strongest magnitude: 6.5 M_{w} Japan
- Total fatalities: 0

Number by magnitude
- 8.0–8.9: 0
- 7.0–7.9: 0
- 6.0–6.9: 4

Date	Country and location	M_{w}	Depth (km)	MMI	Notes	Casualties	
Date	Country and location	M_{w}	Depth (km)	MMI	Notes	Dead	Injured
3	Japan, Bonin Islands offshore	6.5	508.0	I	-	-	-
3	Mexico, Chiapas	4.7	16.2	IV	Adobe houses were damaged near the Tacana Volcano. In neighboring Guatemala, 500 houses were damaged in Ixchiguán.	-	-
10	South Africa, Free State	5.0	5.0	VI	Minor damage occurred in Welkom and in the St. Helena gold mine.	-	-
12	Japan, Ibaraki offshore	6.2	30.0	V	-	-	-
18	Puerto Rico, Santa Isabel offshore	4.7	20.7	IV	Slight damage occurred in Cayey, Cidra, Coamo, Ponce, and Santa Isabel.	-	-
18	Greece, Central Macedonia	4.8	21.4	VI	Slight damage occurred in Edhessa.	-	-
19	Philippines, Cagayan Valley offshore	6.0	77.4	V	Slight damage occurred in several old buildings in Laoag.	-	-
24	Solomon Islands, Western offshore	6.2	10.0	I	-	-	-

=== March ===
March
- Strongest magnitude: 6.7 M_{w} Indonesia
- Deadliest: 2.0 M_{w} United States; 1 death
- Total fatalities: 1

Number by magnitude
- 8.0–8.9: 0
- 7.0–7.9: 0
- 6.0–6.9: 12

Date	Country and location	M_{w}	Depth (km)	MMI	Notes	Casualties	
Date	Country and location	M_{w}	Depth (km)	MMI	Notes	Dead	Injured
3	Albania, Kukës	5.0	18.8	VI	Damage was observed in Kukës.	-	-
3	Albania, Kukës	4.5	16.4	VI	It is an aftershock of the 5.0 event a few hours prior. Additional damage was caused.	-	-
5	Vanuatu, Tafea offshore	6.1	286.6	I	-	-	-
6	Soviet Union, Azeri Soviet Socialist Republic	6.5	33.0	VI	Minor damage occurred in Baku.	-	-
7	Papua New Guinea, East New Britain	6.4	115.9	V	-	-	-
12	United States, Idaho	2.0	1.0	-	This earthquake was triggered by blasting in the Lucky Friday mine near Mullan. As a result, one person died and another two were injured.	1	2
13	Solomon Islands, Western offshore	6.1	65.6	V	-	-	-
14	southern Mid-Atlantic Ridge	6.0	10.0	I	-	-	-
14	New Zealand, Kermadec Islands offshore	6.2	42.1	I	-	-	-
15	Bolivia, Oruro	6.3	243.1	IV	-	-	-
24	Central East Pacific Rise	6.1	10.0	I	-	-	-
24	Japan, Kagoshima offshore	6.3	26.2	IV	-	-	-
24	Indonesia, Papua	6.7	29.0	VII	-	-	-
25	Iran, Hormozgan	5.4	33.0	V	Three houses were destroyed in Gezir.	-	-
26	Brazil, Amazonas	6.3	608.5	I	-	-	-
27	France, Wallis and Futuna offshore	6.0	33.0	VI	-	-	-
31	United States, California	5.7	8.5	VI	Six people were treated for minor injuries. Slight damage was caused in Fremont and power outages occurred in parts of Fremont and San Jose.	-	6

=== April ===
April
- Strongest magnitude: 7.0 M_{w} Mexico
- Deadliest: 5.2 M_{w} Peru; 16 deaths
- Total fatalities: 22

Number by magnitude
- 8.0–8.9: 0
- 7.0–7.9: 1
- 6.0–6.9: 8

Date	Country and location	M_{w}	Depth (km)	MMI	Notes	Casualties	
Date	Country and location	M_{w}	Depth (km)	MMI	Notes	Dead	Injured
1	Fiji, Eastern offshore	6.0	540.0	I	-	-	-
5	United States, California	3.7	13.4	VI	Slight damage occurred in Huntington Beach.	-	-
5	Peru, Cusco	5.2	50.9	IV	At least 16 people were killed, 170 others were injured, 2,000 homes collapsed, and landslides occurred in Cusco.	16	170
10	Indonesia, North Maluku offshore	6.2	13.0	VI	-	-	-
11	United States, Alaska offshore	6.0	33.0	IV	-	-	-
14	Vanuatu, Torba offshore	6.5	29.4	V	-	-	-
14	South Georgia and the South Sandwich Islands offshore	6.4	11.1	I	-	-	-
15	Soviet Union, Russian Soviet Federative Socialist Republic, Kuril Islands offshore	6.3	23.2	V	-	-	-
20	Indonesia, Papua	6.8	33.0	VIII	-	-	-
26	India, Himachal Pradesh	5.5	33.0	VI	Six people were killed, 30 were injured and 85 percent of houses were damaged in Dharmsala.	6	30
30	Mexico, Michoacan	7.0	26.5	V	Some minor damage was caused in Mexico City. Slight damage also occurred in Ciudad Guzmán and in Guadalajara.	-	-

=== May ===
May
- Strongest magnitude: 8.0 M_{w} United States
- Deadliest: 6.1 M_{w} Turkey; 15 deaths
- Total fatalities: 18

Number by magnitude
- 8.0–8.9: 1
- 7.0–7.9: 1
- 6.0–6.9: 14

Date	Country and location	M_{w}	Depth (km)	MMI	Notes	Casualties	
Date	Country and location	M_{w}	Depth (km)	MMI	Notes	Dead	Injured
1	New Caledonia, Loyalty Islands offshore	6.1	51.6	I	-	-	-
2	Iran, Fars	5.6	33.0	V	Damage occurred in Khonj.	-	-
2	Soviet Union, Russian Soviet Socialist Republic, Kamchatka offshore	6.8	14.8	I	-	-	-
3	Iran, Fars	5.2	27.0	V	It is an aftershock of the 5.6 event the day prior. Additional damage was caused in Khonj.	-	-
5	Turkey, Malatya	6.1	9.6	VIII	Due to the 1986 Malatya earthquake, 15 people were killed, another 100 were injured and 4,000 houses were damaged in the Dogansehir-Golbasi area. All houses were damaged in Kapıdere. Slight damage was caused to houses around the cities of Adıyaman and Elbistan. Some dangerous cracks appeared in the arch of Sürgü Dam. Slight damage was caused to railroads in the epicentral area.	15	100
7	United States, Alaska offshore	6.3	22.1	I	It is a foreshock of the 8.0 event a few hours later.	-	-
7	United States, Alaska offshore	8.0	33.0	VII	Largest event of 1986. Slight damage was caused in Atka and Adak. Small tsunamis were observed, with the largest of them hitting Adak, which measured 175 cm high.	-	-
8	United States, Alaska offshore	6.4	18.1	I	Aftershock.	-	-
8	Philippines, Davao offshore	6.4	165.5	IV	-	-	-
11	Japan, Okinawa offshore	6.6	193.5	III	-	-	-
13	Soviet Union, Georgian Soviet Socialist Republic, Samtskhe-Javakheti	5.8	10.0	VII	Two people were killed and 1,500 houses collapsed in Akhalkalaki. Slight damage was also caused in Susuz, in neighboring Turkey.	2	-
15	United States, Alaska offshore	6.4	33.0	VI	It is an aftershock of the 8.0 event on May 8. Slight additional damage was caused in Atka.	-	-
15	Pakistan, Balochistan	5.3	18.2	V	Extensive damage was caused to houses in the Barkham, Watakari and Hamtarot areas.	-	-
17	United States, Alaska offshore	6.5	26.2	VI	Slight damage was caused in Atka. It is an aftershock of the 8.0 event on May 7.	-	-
20	Taiwan, Hualien	6.2	19.3	VIII	One person was killed and five others were injured in Hualien.	1	5
21	Soviet Union, Russian Soviet Socialist Republic, Kuril Islands offshore	6.3	39.1	III	-	-	-
24	Tonga, Niuatoputapu offshore	6.0	33.0	I	-	-	-
26	Fiji offshore	6.8	583.4	I	-	-	-
26	Fiji, Central offshore	7.1	538.3	IV	-	-	-
27	Indonesia, Banda Sea offshore	6.0	627.9	I	-	-	-

=== June ===
June
- Strongest magnitude: 7.2 M_{w} Papua New Guinea
- Deadliest: 6.3 M_{w} Venezuela; 2 deaths
- Total fatalities: 3

Number by magnitude
- 8.0–8.9: 0
- 7.0–7.9: 2
- 6.0–6.9: 16

Date	Country and location	M_{w}	Depth (km)	MMI	Notes	Casualties	
Date	Country and location	M_{w}	Depth (km)	MMI	Notes	Dead	Injured
1	Papua New Guinea, Bougainville offshore	6.0	15.6	I	-	-	-
3	Philippines, Caraga offshore	6.1	67.0	V	-	-	-
6	Turkey, Malatya	5.8	10.0	V	It is an aftershock of the 6.1 event on May 5. Further damage was observed in Surgu, where one person was killed and 15 others were injured. Additional cracks appeared in the Sürgü Dam, and landslides blocked a road between Erkenek and Adıyaman.	1	15
8	Soviet Union, Russian Soviet Socialist Republic, Kuril Islands offshore	6.1	56.2	V	-	-	-
9	Soviet Union, Azerbaijan Soviet Socialist Republic, Lankaran	4.4	33.0	V	Damage was caused to old buildings in the epicentral area.	-	-
11	France, Wallis and Futuna offshore	6.0	17.8	I	-	-	-
11	Venezuela, Sucre	6.3	18.8	VII	Two people were killed, 45 others were injured and many were left homeless in Cariaco. Damage was observed at Corupano, El Pilar and Río Caribe.	2	45
16	Tonga offshore, south of the Fiji Islands	7.1	547.0	II	-	-	-
17	Philippines, Davao offshore	6.0	33.0	II	-	-	-
17	Philippines, Soccksargen offshore	6.6	31.9	V	-	-	-
18	United States, Alaska offshore	6.5	27.0	IV	-	-	-
19	United States, Alaska offshore	6.8	16.7	IV	-	-	-
19	New Zealand, Kermadec Islands offshore	6.1	10.0	I	-	-	-
20	China, Tibet	6.1	33.0	VII	At least 58 houses collapsed and many others were damaged in Ombu.	-	-
24	Japan, Chiba offshore	6.6	62.6	V	-	-	-
24	Papua New Guinea, East Sepik	7.2	102.3	VII	Damage was observed throughout the highlands of Papua New Guinea. Submarine cables from Madang to Guam and Madang to Cairns were damaged. Preliminary estimate of damage approximately 500,000 U.S. dollars.	-	-
24	Ascension Island offshore	6.4	21.6	I	-	-	-
24	New Zealand, Kermadec Islands offshore	6.0	10.7	II	-	-	-
28	Tonga, Tongatapu offshore	6.5	211.2	I	-	-	-
29	New Zealand, Kermadec Islands offshore	6.1	10.0	IV	-	-	-

=== July ===
July
- Strongest magnitude: 6.8 M_{w} Indonesia
- Deadliest: 5.5 M_{w} Venezuela; 1 death 5.7 M_{w} Iran; 1 death
- Total fatalities: 2

Number by magnitude
- 8.0–8.9: 0
- 7.0–7.9: 0
- 6.0–6.9: 13

Date	Country and location	M_{w}	Depth (km)	MMI	Notes	Casualties	
Date	Country and location	M_{w}	Depth (km)	MMI	Notes	Dead	Injured
1	Tonga, Niuas offshore	6.1	33.0	I	-	-	-
5	Australia, Macquarie Island offshore	6.1	10.0	I	-	-	-
5	Mexico, Chiapas	6.0	111.9	IV	-	-	-
6	China, Tibet	6.0	9.1	I	-	-	-
7	Carlsberg Ridge	6.5	7.8	I	-	-	-
8	United States, California	6.0	10.0	VII	The 1986 North Palm Springs earthquake injured 40 people in the North Palm Springs area and caused property damage estimated at $6 million. The most serious damage occurred at the Devers substation of Southern California Edison Company. Also some residences in the Whitewater Canyon area were badly damaged. Damage occurred at Angelus Oaks, Desert Hot Springs, North Palm Springs, Palm Desert, Palm Springs and Yucca Valley. Overall sixteen business structures and four houses were destroyed; 102 houses (mostly mobile homes) and 117 business structures were damaged to some degree. The earthquake disrupted electrical and telephone service, broke water lines and gas lines, and caused failure of two pumping stations in the Metropolitan Water District.	-	40
9	Indonesia, Molucca Sea offshore	6.8	27.6	IV	-	-	-
11	United States, Tennessee	3.3	5.0	VI	Slight damage occurred in Cohutta, Georgia.	-	-
12	Iran, Fars	5.7	10.0	VII	One person was killed, four others were injured and about 300 homes suffered damage in Mamasani.	1	4
12	United States, Ohio	4.5	10.0	VI	Slight damage was caused at Anna, Lima, Minster, New Bremen and St. Marys.	-	-
13	Iran, Fars	4.9	10.0	VI	It is an aftershock of the 5.7 event on July 12. Additional damage was caused.	-	-
13	United States, California offshore	5.5	5.8	VI	29 people were injured, one of them seriously and at least 50 buildings were damaged in the Newport Beach-San Diego area. Preliminary estimate of damage was 720 thousand dollars. Some damage also occurred in Tijuana, in neighboring Mexico.	-	29
16	Vanuatu, Tafea offshore	6.6	111.1	VI	-	-	-
18	Venezuela, Falcón	5.5	7.2	VI	One person died of a heart attack and 30 houses were damaged in Churuguara.	1	-
19	Soviet Union, Russian Soviet Socialist Republic, Kuril Islands offshore	6.3	141.2	I	-	-	-
19	United States, Alaska offshore	6.0	33.0	IV	This two similarly sized earthquakes 16 hours apart can be considered a doublet earthquake. The second event caused some damage in the Dutch Harbor Airport and in Unalaska.	-	-
19	United States, Alaska offshore	6.0	33.0	V	This two similarly sized earthquakes 16 hours apart can be considered a doublet earthquake. The second event caused some damage in the Dutch Harbor Airport and in Unalaska.	-	-
21	United States, California	6.4	8.8	VI	The 1986 Chalfant Valley earthquake injured two people and caused damage in Bishop and Chalfant.	-	2
23	Yugoslavia, Socialist Republic of Serbia, Šumadija and Western Serbia	3.1	10.0	III	Some houses were destroyed and roads were damaged in the Brzeće-Kneževo area.	-	-
23	Italy, Basilicata	4.5	14.8	V	Slight damage occurred in Potenza.	-	-
25	Japan, Okinawa offshore	6.1	21.7	I	-	-	-

=== August ===
August
- Strongest magnitude: 7.5 M_{w} Indonesia
- Deadliest: 7.2 M_{w} Romania; 150 deaths
- Total fatalities: 150

Number by magnitude
- 8.0–8.9: 0
- 7.0–7.9: 2
- 6.0–6.9: 11

Date	Country and location	M_{w}	Depth (km)	MMI	Notes	Casualties	
Date	Country and location	M_{w}	Depth (km)	MMI	Notes	Dead	Injured
3	Turkey, Gaziantep	5.0	11.5	V	At least 73 houses were damaged in Gaziantep and Maras provinces.	-	-
10	Indonesia, North Maluku offshore	6.2	104.2	V	-	-	-
14	Indonesia, Molucca Sea offshore	7.5	33.0	IV	A large number of aftershocks followed this event but were not listed due to cluttering.	-	-
18	Tonga, Ha'apai offshore	6.2	19.7	I	-	-	-
19	Turkey, Manisa	4.1	13.3	IV	Minor damage occurred in Demirci.	-	-
20	Papua New Guinea, East New Britain	6.3	79.1	V	-	-	-
20	China, Qinghai	6.4	33.0	VIII	-	-	-
23	New Zealand, Kermadec Islands offshore	6.6	32.2	I	-	-	-
26	China, Gansu	6.0	8.0	VII	Minor damage occurred in Huzu and Menyuan.	-	-
30	Romania, Buzău	7.2	131.0	VIII	The 1986 Vrancea earthquake caused extensive damage in Romania, where a church collapsed. In neighboring Moldova, (then part of the Soviet Union as the Moldovian Soviet Socialist Republic), at least two people died and at least 558 were injured. However, there were unconfirmed reports of at least 100 people were killed when an apartment partially collapsed in Chișinău, and 50 laborers who died when they were crushed by piles of rubble in Bucharest. Tremors were felt in many parts of Europe, from Poland to Italy.	2–150	558

=== September ===
September
- Strongest magnitude: 6.7 M_{w} Northern Mariana Islands
- Deadliest: 6.0 M_{w} Greece; 20 deaths
- Total fatalities: 20

Number by magnitude
- 8.0–8.9: 0
- 7.0–7.9: 0
- 6.0–6.9: 11

Date	Country and location	M_{w}	Depth (km)	MMI	Notes	Casualties	
Date	Country and location	M_{w}	Depth (km)	MMI	Notes	Dead	Injured
2	Romania, Buzău	4.1	153.1	III	It is an aftershock of the 7.2 magnitude event three days prior. Additional damage was caused in Kishinev and Kagul, in neighboring Moldova.	-	-
5	South Georgia and the South Sandwich Islands offshore	6.1	27.9	I	-	-	-
11	Papua New Guinea, East New Britain offshore	6.5	51.2	V	-	-	-
12	United States, Alaska offshore	6.5	31.3	IV	-	-	-
13	Scotia Sea	6.3	10.0	I	-	-	-
13	New Zealand, Kermadec Islands offshore	6.5	215.3	III	-	-	-
13	Greece, Peloponnese	6.0	11.2	X	The 1986 Kalamata earthquake caused major damage in southern Greece, especially in the city of Kalamata. At least twenty people were killed, about were 300 injured, 2,500 were left homeless and 1,500 buildings were damaged or destroyed.	20	300
14	Papua New Guinea, Bougainville offshore	6.1	58.8	V	-	-	-
15	Greece, Peloponnese	4.9	10.0	VI	It is an aftershock of the 1986 Kalamata earthquake. Additional damage was caused, and 37 people were injured.	-	37
16	Northern Mariana Islands offshore	6.7	47.7	I	-	-	-
16	China, Gansu	5.3	18.4	VI	Damage occurred in Haomen.	-	-
17	Carlsberg Ridge	6.2	10.0	I	-	-	-
25	Mexico, Sinaloa offshore	6.0	10.0	I	-	-	-
25	Indonesia, Talaud Islands offshore	6.0	45.4	V	-	-	-

=== October ===
October
- Strongest magnitude: 7.7 M_{w} New Zealand
- Deadliest: 5.7 M_{w} El Salvador; 1,000 deaths
- Total fatalities: 1,000

Number by magnitude
- 8.0–8.9: 0
- 7.0–7.9: 2
- 6.0–6.9: 13

Date	Country and location	M_{w}	Depth (km)	MMI	Notes	Casualties	
Date	Country and location	M_{w}	Depth (km)	MMI	Notes	Dead	Injured
5	South Africa, Eastern Cape	5.4	5.0	VI	Some damage occurred near Mount Frere.	-	-
6	China, Yunnan	5.4	10.0	VII	Several people were injured and some houses were damaged in Fumin.	-	Several
10	El Salvador, San Salvador	5.7	10.0	IX	Deadliest event of 1986. The 1986 San Salvador earthquake caused severe damage in the country's capital, San Salvador. As a result of this event, at least a thousand people died, 10,000 were injured, and 200,000 were left homeless. Some damage was also observed in Tegucigalpa, the capital of neighboring Honduras.	1,000	10,000
10	El Salvador, San Salvador	4.5	10.0	V	It is an aftershock of the 1986 San Salvador earthquake. Further damage was caused in San Salvador.	-	-
11	Turkey, Aydın	5.7	5.0	VII	Three people were injured and 200 houses were damaged or destroyed in Aydın.	-	3
14	South Africa, Prince Edward Islands offshore	6.2	10.0	I	-	-	-
14	Papua New Guinea, New Ireland offshore	6.8	40.9	V	-	-	-
16	Pakistan, Balochistan	5.0	42.6	IV	150 buildings were damaged in Khuzdar.	-	-
17	Indonesia, Maluku offshore	6.4	67.0	V	-	-	-
20	New Zealand, Kermadec Islands offshore	7.7	29.1	I	Items were knocked off shelves in Raoul Island.	-	-
20	New Zealand, Kermadec Islands offshore	6.1	33.0	I	Aftershock.	-	-
22	Solomon Islands, Santa Cruz Islands offshore	6.0	165.1	I	-	-	-
23	Vanuatu, Penama offshore	6.2	159.6	IV	-	-	-
23	Papua New Guinea, Morobe	6.0	126.9	IV	-	-	-
23	Solomon Islands, Santa Cruz Islands offshore	6.7	18.8	VI	This two similarly sized earthquakes occurring an hour apart can be considered as a doublet earthquake.	-	-
23	Solomon Islands, Santa Cruz Islands offshore	6.5	23.6	VI	This two similarly sized earthquakes occurring an hour apart can be considered as a doublet earthquake.	-	-
24	Papua New Guinea, Bougainville offshore	6.4	52.0	III	-	-	-
24	Solomon Islands, Santa Cruz Islands offshore	6.0	47.3	I	-	-	-
24	Solomon Islands, Santa Cruz Islands offshore	6.3	33.0	V	Too far northeast of the 6.0 event to be considered the 6.3 event a mainshock.	-	-
25	Vanuatu, Shefa offshore	6.4	30.6	V	-	-	-
28	South Africa, North West	5.3	5.0	VII	Some damage occurred in Klerksdorp.	-	-
30	Tonga, Tongatapu offshore	7.2	188.1	V	-	-	-

=== November ===
November
- Strongest magnitude: 7.4 M_{w} Taiwan
- Deadliest: 7.4 M_{w} Taiwan; 15 deaths
- Total fatalities: 15

Number by magnitude
- 8.0–8.9: 0
- 7.0–7.9: 1
- 6.0–6.9: 7

Date	Country and location	M_{w}	Depth (km)	MMI	Notes	Casualties	
Date	Country and location	M_{w}	Depth (km)	MMI	Notes	Dead	Injured
