= 1971 Tuscania earthquake =

Earthquake in Italy

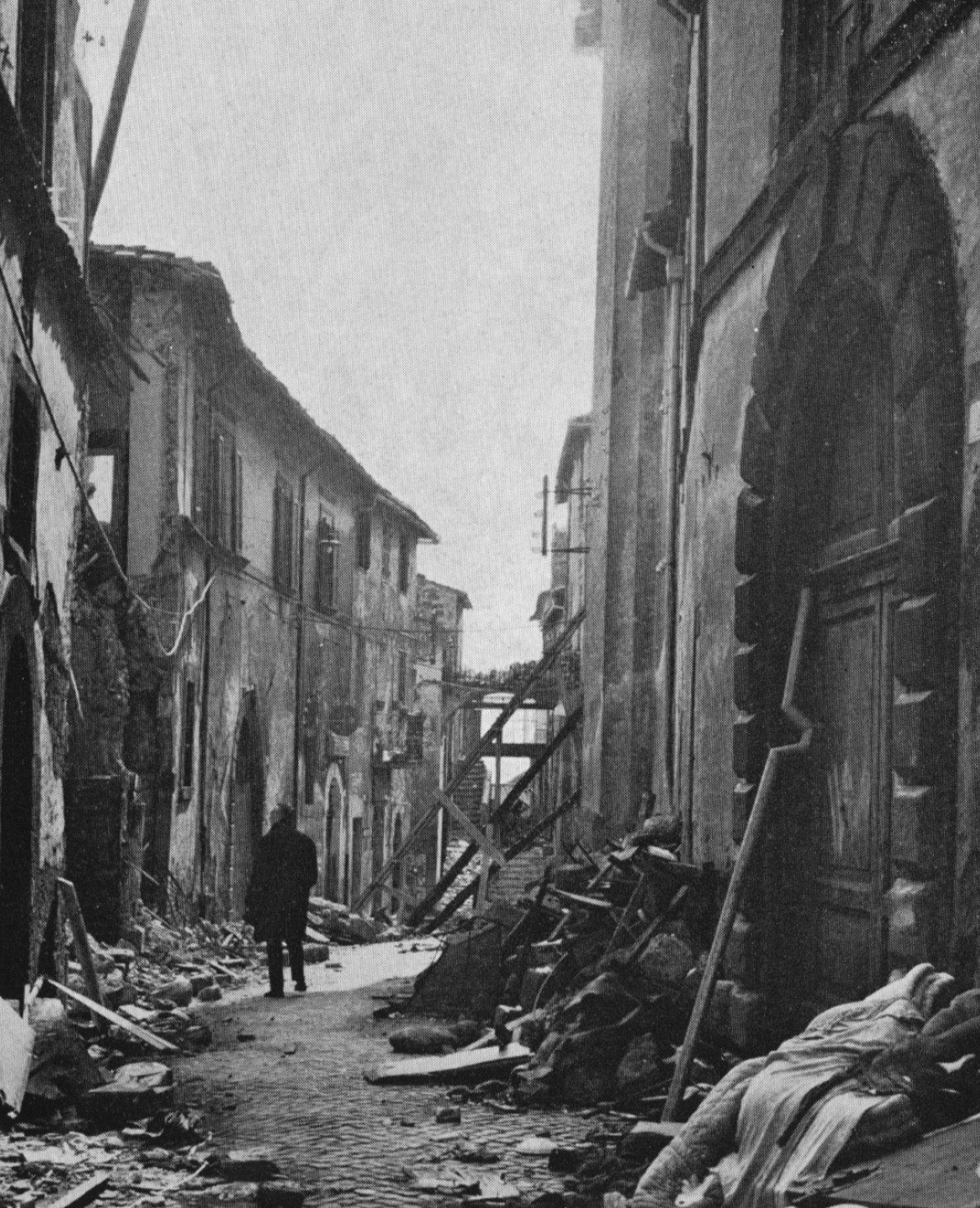

- Location within Italy
- UTC time: 1971-02-06 18:09:08
- ISC event: 786944
- USGS-ANSS: n/a
- Local date: 6 February 1971
- Local time: 19:09 CET
- Magnitude: mb 4.6; M_{d}4.9; M_{L}5.1
- Depth: 2.0 km (1.2 mi)
- Epicenter: 42°26′34.8″N 11°50′45.6″E
- Areas affected: Lazio, Italy
- Max. intensity: EMS-98 VIII (Heavily damaging)
- Casualties: 24–33 dead, 150 injured

The 1971 Tuscania earthquake occurred on 6 February in Italy. It had an epicenter located halfway between Tuscania and Arlena di Castro, about 20 km west of Viterbo. It had a body wave magnitude of 4.6.

== Damage and casualties ==
Despite being a moderately-sized earthquake, it caused major destruction. Between 24 and 33 people were killed, 150 were injured and about 5,000 were left homeless. Forty homes were destroyed and 1,678 were damaged, amounting to a total loss of $41 million (1971 rate). It was reported that the medieval section of Tuscania, a city of 8,000 inhabitants, was practically leveled, and 60 percent of the city's buildings were destroyed. Among those structures sustaining serious damage was the 8th century St. Peter's Church and the 12th century Basilica of St. Mary Major, both recently restored. The heavy damage sustained was due to the shallow depth of the earthquake and poorly constructed buildings.

== See also ==
- List of earthquakes in 1971
- List of earthquakes in Italy
