= List of earthquakes in 1971 =

Earthquakes in 1971
Approximate epicenters of the earthquakes in 1971
- 4.0–5.9 magnitude
- 6.0–6.9 magnitude
- 7.0–7.9 magnitude
- 8.0+ magnitude
- Strongest: Australia, southeast of New Ireland, Papua New Guinea (Magnitude 8.1) July 26
- Deadliest: Turkey, Bingöl Province (Magnitude 6.9) May 22 1,000 deaths
- Total fatalities: 1,290

Number by magnitude
- 9.0+: 0

This is a list of earthquakes in 1971. Only magnitude 6.0 or greater earthquakes appear on the list. Lower magnitude events are included if they have caused death, injury or damage. Events which occurred in remote areas will be excluded from the list as they wouldn't have generated significant media interest. All dates are listed according to UTC time. Maximum intensities are indicated on the Mercalli intensity scale and are sourced from United States Geological Survey (USGS) ShakeMap data. Like the previous year, 1971 had heightened seismic activity. 20 earthquakes exceeded magnitude 7 with 2 of those measuring above magnitude 8. Both of the magnitude 8 events happened within a 12-day span in July in Papua New Guinea. A fairly robust aftershock sequence followed which contributed to the number of magnitude 7+ events. Chile, Russia and Indonesia had significant events during the year. The deadliest earthquake accounting for the vast majority of the 1,290 fatalities occurred in Turkey in May. 1,000 died in this event coming not long after another deadly event elsewhere in the country. In February, Los Angeles, California was jolted by one of its largest events resulting in 65 deaths.

== Overall ==
=== By death toll ===
Rank	Death toll	Magnitude	Location	MMI	Depth (km)	Date
1	1,000	6.9	Turkey, Bingöl Province	VIII (Severe)	10.0	May 22
2	100	6.2	Turkey, Burdur Province	VII (Very strong)	22.5	May 12
3	83	7.8	Chile, Valparaíso Region	IX (Violent)	60.3	July 9
4	65	6.6	United States, San Fernando Valley, California	XI (Extreme)	9.0	February 9
5	24	4.6	Italy, Lazio	VIII (Severe)	33.0	February 6

- Note: At least 10 casualties

=== By magnitude ===
Rank	Magnitude	Death toll	Location	MMI	Depth (km)	Date
1	8.1	0	Australia, southeast of New Ireland, Papua and New Guinea	VIII (Severe)	40.0	July 26
2	8.0	3	Australia, southeast of New Ireland, Papua and New Guinea	IX (Violent)	40.0	July 14
3	7.8	83	Chile, Valparaíso Region	IX (Violent)	60.3	July 9
4	7.7	0	Indonesia, Papua (province)	IX (Violent)	30.0	January 10
5	7.6	0	Soviet Union, off the east coast of Kamchatka, Russia	X (Extreme)	27.5	December 15
6	7.4	1	Peru, Loreto Region	VII (Very strong)	120.0	July 27
= 7	7.3	0	Soviet Union, southwest of Sakhalin Island, Russia	IX (Violent)	18.1	September 5
= 7	7.3	0	Soviet Union, off the east coast of Kamchatka, Russia	VII (Very strong)	125.0	November 24
= 8	7.1	0	southern Mid-Atlantic Ridge	( )	15.0	January 3
= 8	7.1	0	Japan, off the south coast of Hokkaido	VI (Strong)	54.8	August 2
= 8	7.1	0	United Kingdom, Santa Cruz Islands, Solomon Islands	VII (Very strong)	113.1	November 21
= 9	7.0	0	Indonesia, off the west coast of Sumatra	VII (Very strong)	30.0	February 4
= 9	7.0	0	United States, Andreanof Islands, Alaska	VI (Strong)	28.9	February 7
= 9	7.0	0	United Kingdom, South Shetland Islands	( )	12.5	February 8
= 9	7.0	0	Indonesia, off the west coast of Sumatra	V (Moderate)	75.0	April 8
= 9	7.0	0	United States, Andreanof Islands, Alaska	VII (Very strong)	24.2	May 2
= 9	7.0	0	Soviet Union, Magadan Oblast, Russia	VIII (Severe)	10.0	May 18
= 9	7.0	0	Australia, southeast of New Ireland, Papua and New Guinea	VI (Strong)	35.0	July 19
= 9	7.0	0	Australia, off the east coast of New Britain, Papua and New Guinea	VI (Strong)	40.0	July 26
= 9	7.0	0	Indonesia, Banda Sea	V (Moderate)	131.0	September 16

- Note: At least 7.0 magnitude

== Notable events ==
=== January ===
January
- Strongest: 7.7 M_{w} Indonesia
- Total fatalities: 0

Number by magnitude
- 8.0–8.9: 0
- 7.0–7.9: 2
- 6.0–6.9: 9

Date	Country and location	M_{w}	Depth (km)	MMI	Notes	Casualties	
Date	Country and location	M_{w}	Depth (km)	MMI	Notes	Dead	Injured
1	Australia, Sandaun Province, Papua and New Guinea	6.0	35.0	VI			
3	southern Mid-Atlantic Ridge	7.1	15.0				
10	Indonesia, Papua (province)	7.7	30.0	IX	A few homes collapsed whilst others sustained damage.		
10	Indonesia, Papua (province)	6.6	30.0	VI	Aftershock.		
10	Indonesia, Papua (province)	6.0	30.0	VI	Aftershock.		
10	Indonesia, Papua (province)	6.0	30.0	VI	Aftershock.		
10	Indonesia, Papua (province)	6.2	30.0	VI	Aftershock.		
10	Indonesia, Papua (province)	6.0	30.0	VI	Aftershock.		
25	Australia, D'Entrecasteaux Islands, Papua and New Guinea	6.2	20.0	VI			
25	United States, Andreanof Islands, Alaska	6.4	35.0	IV			
29	Soviet Union, Sea of Okhotsk, Russia	6.9	535.6				

=== February ===
February
- Strongest: 7.0 M_{w} 3 events
- Deadliest: 6.6 M_{w} United States; 65 deaths
- Total fatalities: 90

Number by magnitude
- 8.0–8.9: 0
- 7.0–7.9: 3
- 6.0–6.9: 4
- 5.0–5.9: 1

Date	Country and location	M_{w}	Depth (km)	MMI	Notes	Casualties	
Date	Country and location	M_{w}	Depth (km)	MMI	Notes	Dead	Injured
4	Indonesia, off the west coast of Sumatra	7.0	30.0	VII	Some damage was caused.		
6	Italy, Lazio	4.6	33.0	VIII	Despite being a moderate magnitude, the 1971 Tuscania earthquake caused major destruction. 24 people were killed and 150 were injured. 40 homes were destroyed and 1,678 were damaged. Costs were $41 million (1971 rate).	24	150
7	United States, Andreanof Islands, Alaska	7.0	28.9	VI			
8	United Kingdom, South Shetland Islands	7.0	12.5				
9	United States, San Fernando Valley, California	6.6	9.0	XI	One of the most destructive events to affect southern California. 65 people were killed and over 2,000 were injured in the 1971 San Fernando earthquake. Extensive property damage was reported with costs $505 million (1971 rate).	65	2,000
14	Iran, Semnan Province	5.8	18.5	VII	1 person died and some damage was caused.	1	
15	Fiji, south of	6.5	587.2				
21	Argentina, Jujuy Province	6.9	183.7	V			
26	United Kingdom, Solomon Islands	6.0	98.4	IV			

=== March ===
March
- Strongest: 6.6 M_{w} Australia, Papua and New Guinea
- Total fatalities: 0

Number by magnitude
- 8.0–8.9: 0
- 7.0–7.9: 0
- 6.0–6.9: 5

Date	Country and location	M_{w}	Depth (km)	MMI	Notes	Casualties	
Date	Country and location	M_{w}	Depth (km)	MMI	Notes	Dead	Injured
13	Australia, Madang Province, Papua and New Guinea	6.6	111.0	VI			
16	Philippines, off the east coast of Mindanao	6.1	58.5				
23	Norway, east of Jan Mayen Island	6.2	15.0				
23	China, western Xinjiang Province	6.2	15.0	VII			
24	China, southern Qinghai Province	6.0	10.0	VIII			

=== April ===
April
- Strongest: 7.0 M_{w} Indonesia
- Deadliest: 6.1 M_{w} Iran; 1 death
- Total fatalities: 1

Number by magnitude
- 8.0–8.9: 0
- 7.0–7.9: 1
- 6.0–6.9: 5

Date	Country and location	M_{w}	Depth (km)	MMI	Notes	Casualties	
Date	Country and location	M_{w}	Depth (km)	MMI	Notes	Dead	Injured
4	Japan, off the east coast of Honshu	6.1	35.0	IV			
7	Indonesia, northeast of Halmahera	6.6	31.3	V			
8	Indonesia, off the west coast of Sumatra	7.0	75.0	VII			
12	Iran, Hormozgan province	6.1	15.0	VII	1 person was killed and major damage was reported.	1	
28	China, Yunnan Province	6.4	10.0	VII			
29	Philippines, Sibuyan Sea	6.0	11.7	VII			

=== May ===
May
- Strongest: 7.0 M_{w} 2 events
- Deadliest: 6.9 M_{w} Turkey; 1,000 deaths
- Total fatalities: 1,100

Number by magnitude
- 8.0–8.9: 0
- 7.0–7.9: 2
- 6.0–6.9: 13

Date	Country and location	M_{w}	Depth (km)	MMI	Notes	Casualties	
Date	Country and location	M_{w}	Depth (km)	MMI	Notes	Dead	Injured
2	United States, Andreanof Islands, Alaska	7.0	24.2	VII			
3	United Kingdom, Solomon Islands	6.0	10.0	IV			
4	Indonesia, Sunda Strait	6.4	45.0	VI			
7	Indonesia, South Sulawesi	6.0	26.8	VI			
8	Argentina, Chubut Province	6.0	156.2				
12	Turkey, Burdur Province	6.2	22.5	VII	100 people were killed and at least 101 were injured. Major damage was caused.	100	101+
17	Ecuador, Pastaza Province	6.7	171.6	V			
18	Argentina, La Rioja Province, Argentina	6.0	85.0	V			
18	Soviet Union, Magadan Oblast, Russia	7.0	10.0	VIII			
22	Turkey, Bingöl Province	6.9	10.0	VIII	Deadliest event of 1971. The 1971 Bingöl earthquake caused 1,000 deaths and at least 51 injuries. Property damage was caused with costs reaching $5 million (1971 rate).	1,000	51+
25	Japan, off the southeast coast of Kyushu	6.1	30.0	VI	Beginning of a series of events.		
26	Japan, off the southeast coast of Kyushu	6.2	51.1	VI			
29	Japan, off the southeast coast of Kyushu	6.0	35.0	V			
30	Burma, Kachin State	6.3	15.0	VIII			
31	Burma, Kachin State	6.1	20.0	VIII	Aftershock.		

=== June ===
June
- Strongest: 6.8 M_{w} United States
- Deadliest: 2 events each resulted in 1 death.
- Total fatalities: 2

Number by magnitude
- 8.0–8.9: 0
- 7.0–7.9: 0
- 6.0–6.9: 5
- 5.0–5.9: 1

Date	Country and location	M_{w}	Depth (km)	MMI	Notes	Casualties	
Date	Country and location	M_{w}	Depth (km)	MMI	Notes	Dead	Injured
11	Dominican Republic, off the south coast of	6.5	35.0	VII	At least 51 people were injured and some damage was caused.		51+
11	United States, Rat Islands, Alaska	6.8	25.0	IV			
14	Soviet Union, Amur Oblast, Russia	6.0	10.0				
15	China, western Xinjiang Province	6.0	11.9	VII			
16	Indonesia, Central Java	5.2	35.0		1 person was killed and another 6 were injured. 1,377 homes were damaged.	1	6
17	Chile, Antofagasta Region	6.3	91.7	VII	1 person was killed and some damage was caused.	1	

=== July ===
July
- Strongest: 8.1 M_{w} Australia, Papua and New Guinea
- Deadliest: 7.8 M_{w} Chile; 83 deaths
- Total fatalities: 89

Number by magnitude
- 8.0–8.9: 2
- 7.0–7.9: 4
- 6.0–6.9: 9
- 5.0–5.9: 1

Date	Country and location	M_{w}	Depth (km)	MMI	Notes	Casualties	
Date	Country and location	M_{w}	Depth (km)	MMI	Notes	Dead	Injured
2	Philippines, northeast of Masbate Island	6.1	25.0	VI	Foreshock to event on July 25.		
9	Chile, Valparaíso Region	7.8	60.3	IX	83 people were killed and 447 were injured in the 1971 Aconcagua earthquake. Major property damage was caused. Costs were $236 million (1971 rate).	83	447
11	Chile, off the coast of Valparaíso Region	6.4	35.0	VI	Aftershock.		
14	Australia, southeast of New Ireland, Papua and New Guinea	8.0	40.0	IX	The 1971 Solomon Islands earthquakes was an example of a doublet earthquake. The second principle event struck on July 26. Many aftershocks followed. To minimise cluttering only aftershocks greater than magnitude 6.5 will be noted. In this event 3 people were killed in total including 1 in a tsunami that was triggered. 5 people were injured. Some damage was caused.	3	5
14	Australia, southeast of New Ireland, Papua and New Guinea	6.5	40.0	V	Aftershock.		
15	Italy, Parma	5.2	7.0		2 people were killed and some damage was caused.	2	
18	Australia, southeast of New Ireland, Papua and New Guinea	6.6	47.5	VI	Aftershock of July 14 event.		
19	Australia, southeast of New Ireland, Papua and New Guinea	7.0	35.0	VI	Aftershock of July 14 event.		
19	Australia, West New Britain Province, Papua and New Guinea	6.3	10.0	VII			
25	Philippines, northeast of Masbate Island	6.4	40.0	VII			
26	Australia, southeast of New Ireland, Papua and New Guinea	8.1	40.0	VIII	Largest event of 1971. The 1971 Solomon Islands earthquakes was an example of a doublet earthquake. The first principle event struck on July 14. Many aftershocks followed. To minimise cluttering only aftershocks greater than magnitude 6.5 will be noted. A tsunami caused some damage in the area.		
26	China, southern Xinjiang Province	6.0	20.0	VII			
26	Australia, off the east coast of New Britain, Papua and New Guinea	6.6	40.0	VI	Aftershock.		
26	Australia, off the east coast of New Britain, Papua and New Guinea	7.0	40.0	VI	Aftershock.		
27	Peru, Loreto Region	7.4	120.0	VII	1 person was killed and at least 51 were injured. Some damage was caused.	1	51+
27	Australia, south of New Ireland, Papua and New Guinea	6.6	40.0	V	Aftershock of July 26 event.		
28	Australia, south of New Ireland, Papua and New Guinea	6.5	24.5	VI	Aftershock of July 26 event.		

=== August ===
August
- Strongest: 7.1 M_{w} Japan
- Deadliest: 2 events caused 1 death each.
- Total fatalities: 2

Number by magnitude
- 8.0–8.9: 0
- 7.0–7.9: 1
- 6.0–6.9: 5
- 5.0–5.9: 2

Date	Country and location	M_{w}	Depth (km)	MMI	Notes	Casualties	
Date	Country and location	M_{w}	Depth (km)	MMI	Notes	Dead	Injured
2	Japan, off the south coast of Hokkaido	7.1	54.8	VI	Some damage was caused.		
9	Iran, Mazandaran province	5.6	20.0	VI	1 person was killed and some damage was caused.	1	
9	Australia, off the west coast of Bougainville Island, Papua and New Guinea	6.5	64.5	V			
14	Fiji	6.6	25.0	rowspan="2"| Doublet earthquake. Two events a minute apart.			
14	Fiji	6.5	25.0				
16	China, Sichuan Province	5.7	20.0	VII	At least 1 person died and a few homes were destroyed.	1+	
19	Taiwan, off the east coast of	6.3	25.6	V			
23	Australia, off the north coast of mainland Papua and New Guinea	6.5	10.0	V			

=== September ===
September
- Strongest: 7.3 M_{w} Soviet Union, Russia
- Total fatalities: 0

Number by magnitude
- 8.0–8.9: 0
- 7.0–7.9: 2
- 6.0–6.9: 8

Date	Country and location	M_{w}	Depth (km)	MMI	Notes	Casualties	
Date	Country and location	M_{w}	Depth (km)	MMI	Notes	Dead	Injured
5	Soviet Union, southwest of Sakhalin Island, Russia	7.3	18.1	IX	Some damage was caused.		
6	Soviet Union, southwest of Sakhalin Island, Russia	6.1	19.2	VI	Aftershock.		
8	Soviet Union, southwest of Sakhalin Island, Russia	6.8	17.5	VI	Aftershock.		
8	Soviet Union, southwest of Sakhalin Island, Russia	6.5	20.0	VI	Aftershock.		
10	Tonga	6.0	20.0				
16	Indonesia, Banda Sea	7.0	131.0	V			
25	Australia, Morobe Province, Papua and New Guinea	6.8	110.8	VII	Some damage was reported.		
27	Soviet Union, southwest of Sakhalin Island, Russia	6.6	18.4	VI	Aftershock of September 5 event.		
30	Mexico, Gulf of California	6.5	15.0	VI			
30	Soviet Union, Khabarovsk Krai, Russia	6.0	15.0				

=== October ===
October
- Strongest: 6.8 2 events reached this magnitude.
- Deadliest: 5.5 M_{w} Peru; 5 deaths
- Total fatalities: 6

Number by magnitude
- 8.0–8.9: 0
- 7.0–7.9: 0
- 6.0–6.9: 9
- 5.0–5.9: 1

Date	Country and location	M_{w}	Depth (km)	MMI	Notes	Casualties	
Date	Country and location	M_{w}	Depth (km)	MMI	Notes	Dead	Injured
1	Australia, New Ireland, Papua and New Guinea	6.0	20.0	VI			
3	Australia, west of Bougainville Island, Papua and New Guinea	6.0	55.0	V	Foreshock to October 4 event.		
3	New Hebrides, east of Vanuatu	6.7	10.0				
4	Australia, west of Bougainville Island, Papua and New Guinea	6.8	45.0	VI			
15	Peru, Apurimac Region	5.5	35.0	IX	5 people were killed and major damage was caused.	5	
23	United States, south of the Northern Mariana Islands	6.6	21.6	rowspan="2"| Doublet earthquake.			
24	United States, south of the Northern Mariana Islands	6.5	25.0				
27	New Hebrides, Vanuatu	6.8	45.0	VII	1 person was killed and at least 51 were injured. Major damage was caused.	1	51+
28	New Hebrides, Vanuatu	6.7	35.0		Different area of the country than previous event.		
30	Taiwan, off the east coast of	6.2	35.0	V			

=== November ===
November
- Strongest: 7.3 M_{w} Soviet Union, Russia
- Total fatalities: 0

Number by magnitude
- 8.0–8.9: 0
- 7.0–7.9: 2
- 6.0–6.9: 2

Date	Country and location	M_{w}	Depth (km)	MMI	Notes	Casualties	
Date	Country and location	M_{w}	Depth (km)	MMI	Notes	Dead	Injured
8	Iran, Hormozgan province	6.2	20.0	VII			
20	Fiji, south of	6.5	543.1				
21	United Kingdom, Santa Cruz Islands, Solomon Islands	7.1	113.1	VII			
24	Soviet Union, off the east coast of Kamchatka, Russia	7.3	125.0	VII			

=== December ===
December
- Strongest: 7.6 M_{w} Soviet Union, Russia
- Total fatalities: 0

Number by magnitude
- 8.0–8.9: 0
- 7.0–7.9: 1
- 6.0–6.9: 5

Date	Country and location	M_{w}	Depth (km)	MMI	Notes	Casualties	
Date	Country and location	M_{w}	Depth (km)	MMI	Notes	Dead	Injured
2	Soviet Union, east of the Kuril Islands, Russia	6.6	20.0				
4	Australia, west of Bougainville Island, Papua New Guinea	6.3	82.9	V			
8	Chile, offshore Antofagasta Region	6.1	30.0	VI			
11	Australia, west of Bougainville Island, Papua New Guinea	6.5	55.0	V			
15	Soviet Union, off the east coast of Kamchatka, Russia	7.6	27.5	X			
30	Australia, East New Britain Province, Papua New Guinea	6.0	111.3	IV			
