= Pütürge =

- District and municipality
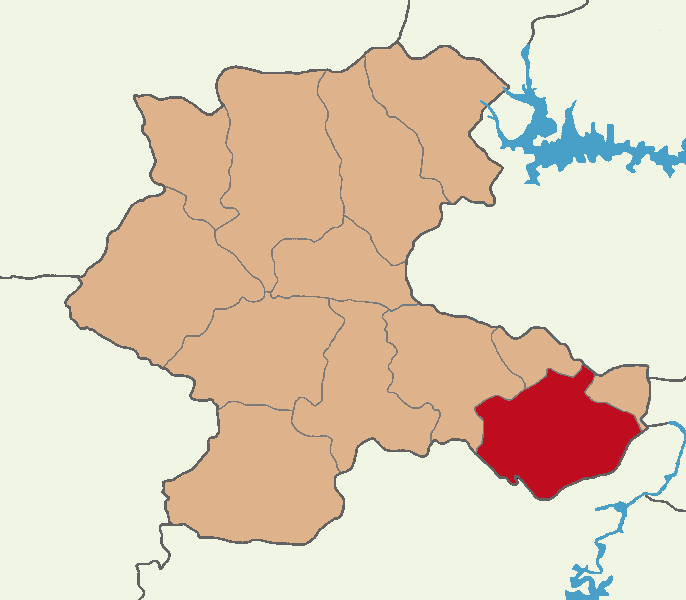
- Map showing Pütürge District in Malatya Province

- Location within Turkey
- Coordinates: 38°11′48″N 38°52′11″E
- Country: Turkey
- Province: Malatya

Government
  - Mayor: Mikail Sülük (AKP)
- Area: 1,086 km^{2} (419 sq mi)
- Elevation: 1,250 m (4,100 ft)
- Population (2022): 12,492
  - Density: 11.50/km^{2} (29.79/sq mi)
- Time zone: UTC+3 (TRT)
- Postal code: 44850
- Area code: 0422
- Website: www.puturge.bel.tr

Pütürge or Pötürge (Kurdish: Şîro) is a municipality and district of Malatya Province, Turkey. Its area is 1,086 km^{2}, and its population is 12,492 (2022). The mayor is Mikail Sülük (AKP).

== Composition ==
There are 68 neighbourhoods in Pütürge District:

- Ağalar
- Aktarla
- Aliçeri
- Alihan
- Arınlı
- Arıtoprak
- Arslankent
- Bakımlı
- Balpınarı
- Başmezra
- Bayırköy
- Belenköy
- Bölükkaya
- Bölünmez
- Büyüköz
- Çamlıdere
- Çayköy
- Çengelli
- Çığırlı
- Çukuroymağı
- Deredüzü
- Erdemler
- Ersele
- Esencik
- Esenlik
- Gertan
- Gözlüce
- Gündeğer
- Gündüz
- Hatip
- Karakaya
- Karşıyaka
- Kavaklıdere
- Kayadere
- Koçköy
- Köklükaya
- Körme
- Korucak
- Köylü
- Kozluk
- Meşedibi
- Nohutlu
- Örencik
- Ormaniçi
- Örmeli
- Örnekköy
- Pazarcık
- Poskıran
- Sahilköy
- Şiro Taraksu
- Söğütlü
- Şükan
- Taşbaşı
- Taşmış
- Taştepe
- Tatlıcak
- Tekederesi
- Teluşağı
- Tepehan
- Üçyaka
- Ulutaş
- Uzunkoru
- Uzuntaş
- Yamaç
- Yandere
- Yazıca
- Yediyol
- Yeşildere

== Demography ==
The district is populated by Kurds (both Alevi and Sunni).
