= Marash triple junction =

Place where the Anatolian plate, the Eurasian plate and the Arabian plate meet

The Maraş triple junction at the junction of the East Anatolian Fault and Dead Sea Transform

The Marash triple junction (also Maraş triple junction) is a geologic triple junction of three tectonic plates: the Anatolian plate, the African plate and the Arabian plate.

The Marash triple junction is found where the side-by-side African and Arabian plates, both drifting north and demarcated by the north–south trending Dead Sea Transform (itself an extension of the African Rift Valleys), come up against the Anatolian plate lying across their path at the East Anatolian Fault. It is the junction of the Dead Sea (Levant) Fault zone, the East Anatolian Fault zone, and the Cyprus Arc which is subducting and is very complex. There is now evidence for two triple junctions to explain this complexity, which have been called the Hatay triple junction (also known as the Amik triple junction), where the Cyprus arc reaches the Dead Sea (Levant) Fault and the Kahramanmaraş triple junction (also known as the Türkoğlu triple junction), where the Kyrenia–Misis Fault zone reaches the East Anatolian Fault. The junction site is near the Gulf of Alexandretta, and is about 700 km (430 mi) distant from the Karlıova triple junction. After a long quiescence, the Marash triple junction was ruptured by the violent 2023 Turkey–Syria earthquake. Work subsequent to this earthquake shows that at Cyprus the relative motion of Arabian plate and Anatolia plate is 3.5 to 6.2 mm/a (0.14 to 0.24 in/year), decreasing from west to east. The left-lateral transpression of the Kyrenia fault, along the northern coast of Cyprus moves at 3.3 to 4.2 mm/a (0.13 to 0.17 in/year). The Dead Sea (Levant} Fault zone to the west has a 3.5 to 4.7 mm/a (0.14 to 0.19 in/year) left-lateral slip rate.
