= Sürgü Dam =

- Location: Turkey
- Coordinates: 38.0346°N 37.8801°E

Sürgü Dam is a dam in Turkey. The development was backed by the Turkish State Hydraulic Works.

== See also ==
- List of dams and reservoirs in Turkey
