= 1971 Solomon Islands earthquakes =

Earthquakes in Papua New Guinea

- Location within Papua New Guinea
- UTC time: Doublet earthquake:
- A: 1971-07-14 06:11:29
- B: 1971-07-26 01:23:22
- ISC event
- A: 782181
- B: 782684
- USGS-ANSS
- A: ComCat
- B: ComCat
- Local time
- A: 16:11:29
- B: 11:23:22
- Magnitude
- A: mb 6.0, M_{s} 7.8 (ISC); M_{w} 8.0 (ANSS)
- B: mb 6.6, M_{s} 7.7 (ISC); M_{w} 8.1 (ANSS)
- Depth: A: 45 km (28 mi); B: 37 km (23 mi)
- Max. intensity: A: MMI IX (Violent); B: MMI VI (Strong)
- Casualties: 2 dead, 5 injured

The 1971 Solomon Islands earthquakes occurred in the northern part of the Solomon Islands, within Papua New Guinea as a doublet earthquake. The first large shock occurred on July 14 at 06:11 UTC with a magnitude of M_{w} 8.0. The second large event occurred on July 26 at 01:23 UTC with a magnitude of M_{w} 8.1. The initial event on July 14 caused a tsunami, which was observed in Rabaul. The earthquake of July 26 triggered a tsunami with a 3.4 m (11 ft) runup in New Britain.

Shallow, large thrust earthquakes in the Solomon Islands tend to occur in multiplets. Examples of such earthquakes include the doublets occurred in 1971, 1974, and 1975. The 1971 doublet occurred at the junction of two trenches. The July 14 earthquake is located in the northwestern Solomon Islands Trench, while the July 26 earthquake ruptured the northeastern New Britain Trench. The July 14 earthquake and the July 26 earthquake were caused by the subduction of the Solomon Sea plate beneath the Pacific plate and the Bismark Sea Plate, respectively. The 1971 sequence had the largest earthquake in 50 years in this region as it occurred.

== See also ==
- List of earthquakes in 1971
- List of earthquakes in Papua New Guinea
- List of earthquakes in the Solomon Islands
