= 2010 Elazığ earthquake =

Earthquake in eastern Turkey

- UTC time: 2010-03-08 02:32:35
- ISC event: 14373453
- USGS-ANSS: ComCat
- Local date: 8 March 2010
- Local time: 04:32
- Magnitude: 6.1 M_{w}
- Depth: 10 km (6.2 mi)
- Epicenter: 38.79°N 40.03°E
- Fault: East Anatolian Fault
- Type: Strike-slip
- Areas affected: Turkey
- Max. intensity: MMI VI (Strong)
- Casualties: 42–57 dead, 74 injured

The 2010 Elazığ earthquake was a 6.1 M_{w} earthquake that occurred on 8 March 2010 at 02:32 UTC (04:32 local time). The epicentre was Başyurt in Elazığ Province, in eastern Turkey. Initial reports in global media said as many as 57 people had died. By 10 March, reports in the Turkish media placed the death toll at 41 and later, the death toll rose to 42. Another 74 were injured, many after falling and jumping from buildings. A stampede through the streets led to further injuries.

The earthquake came one week to the day after the Turkish Chamber of Civil Engineers sent a report to parliament detailing inadequate building projects and the possibility that Istanbul would be destroyed by an earthquake, which could kill tens of thousands of people, at some point in the next three decades.

== Earthquake ==
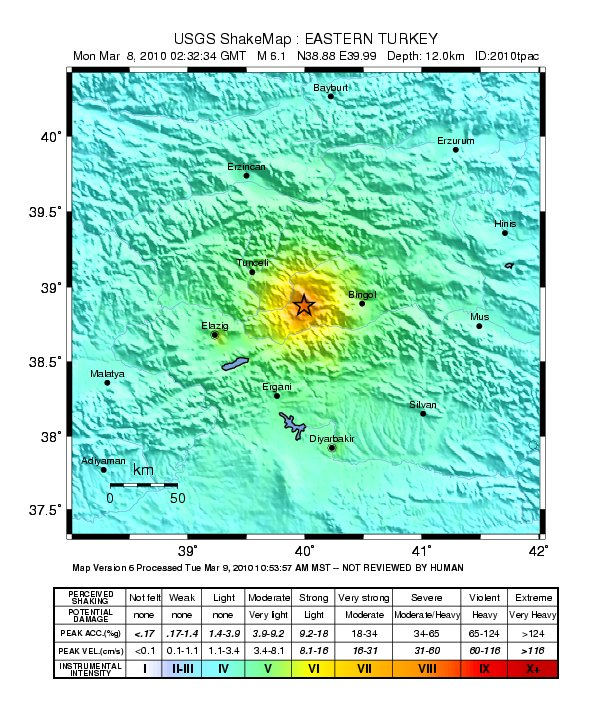
USGS ShakeMap for the event

The quake occurred on the East Anatolian Fault, a major transform fault which represents the boundary between the Anatolian Plate and the Arabian plate.

=== Damage ===
According to officials, most of the deaths occurred in three villages: Okçular, Yukarı Kanatlı and Kayalı. At least five villages, though, suffered loss of life. Villagers fled buildings, spending the night outside and lighting fires in the streets for warmth.

Thirty houses collapsed in Okçular, and the death toll is at least 17. Reports from the scene indicate "the village is totally flattened" and "everything has been knocked down – there is not a stone in place".

At least 25 people died in Yukarı Demirci, and emergency services went to Kovancılar.

Many people used vehicles and taxis to drive to the hospital. Most were asleep at the time the quake struck, with four sleeping sisters perishing in one house. Farm animals were also killed, and minarets fell down.

=== Aftershocks ===
Several aftershocks were felt, the strongest measuring 5.5 (at 09:47 local time), 5.1 (at 12:14) and 5.3 (at 13:12). A total of over 20 aftershocks were counted within a short time following the quake. Villagers were told to stay away from buildings for several days due to the potential of further aftershocks.

Onur Tan et al. (2011) analyzed 2130 aftershocks (ML≥0.3) and reported in Geophysical Research Letters.

== Response ==
Turkey: Four government ministers, including Deputy Prime Minister Cemil Çiçek, visited the scene as soon as news of the earthquake was reported. The Red Crescent and Turkey's disaster management centre donated blankets and tents. Prime Minister Recep Tayyip Erdoğan later arrived.

Pakistan: Prime Minister Yousaf Raza Gillani sent a condolence message to his Turkish counterpart Recep Tayyip Erdoğan over the loss of lives and property and said that "We have learnt with utter sense of shock and profound sadness the news of the massive earthquake that has hit your beautiful country, today. Our hearts go out to our Turkish brethren over the loss of precious lives and destruction of property. I wish to convey, on behalf of the people and Government of Pakistan and on my own behalf our deepest condolences and commiserations to the people and Government of Turkey in bearing this enormous natural calamity."

Israel: Defense Minister Ehud Barak ordered an aid proposal to be put together but later said that Turkey informed Israel that it did not require assistance at this time.

== See also ==
- 2020 Elazığ earthquake
- List of earthquakes in 2010
- List of earthquakes in Turkey
