= Bingöl =

City in Bingöl Province, Turkey

- Municipality
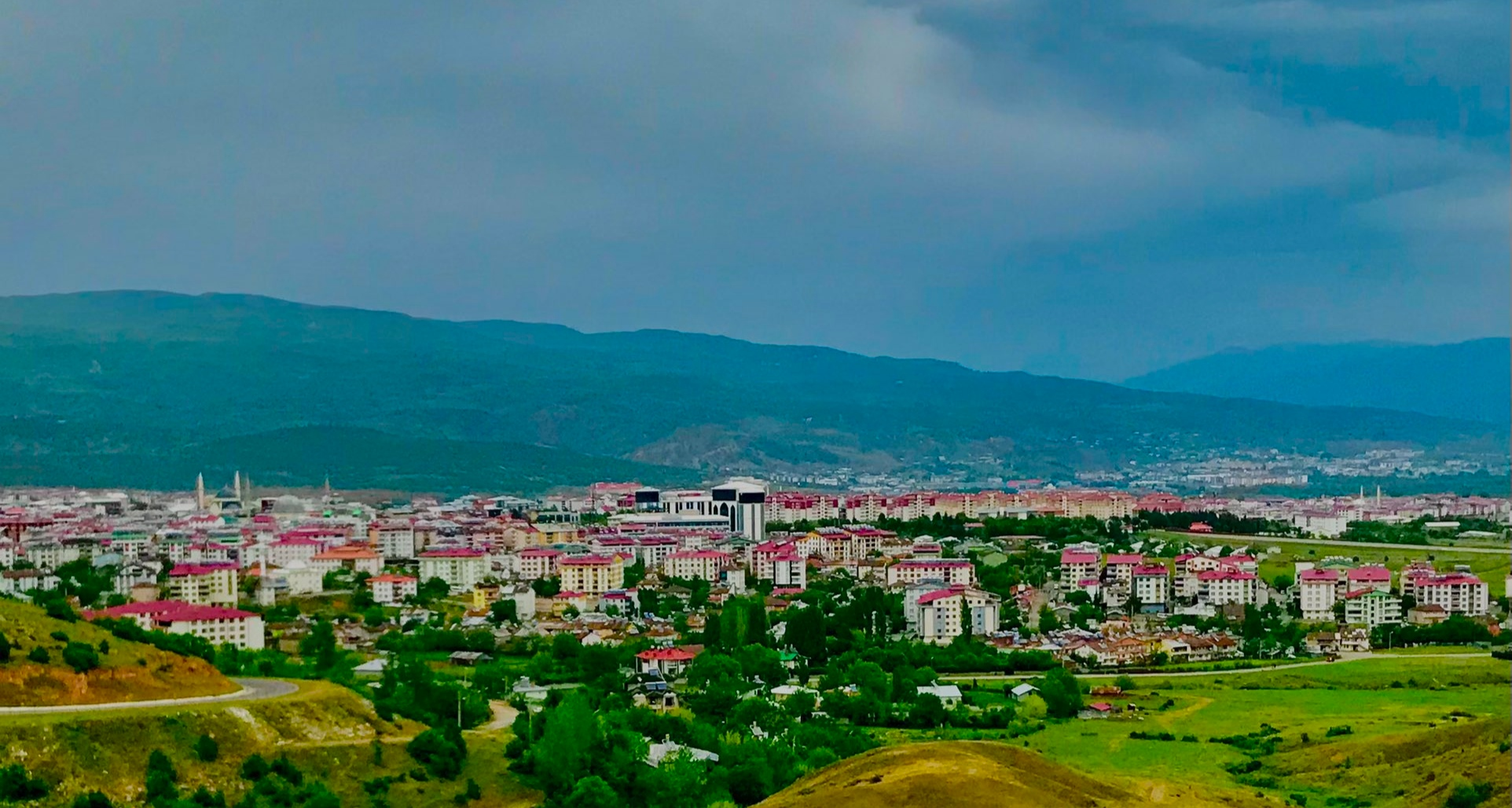

- Coat of arms

- Location within Turkey
- Coordinates: 38°53′10″N 40°30′6″E
- Country: Turkey
- Province: Bingöl
- District: Bingöl

Government
  - Mayor: Erdal Arıkan (AK Party)
- Elevation: 1,120 m (3,670 ft)
- Population (2022): 133,423
- Time zone: UTC+3 (TRT)
- Postal code: 12000
- Area code: 0426
- Website: www.bingol.bel.tr

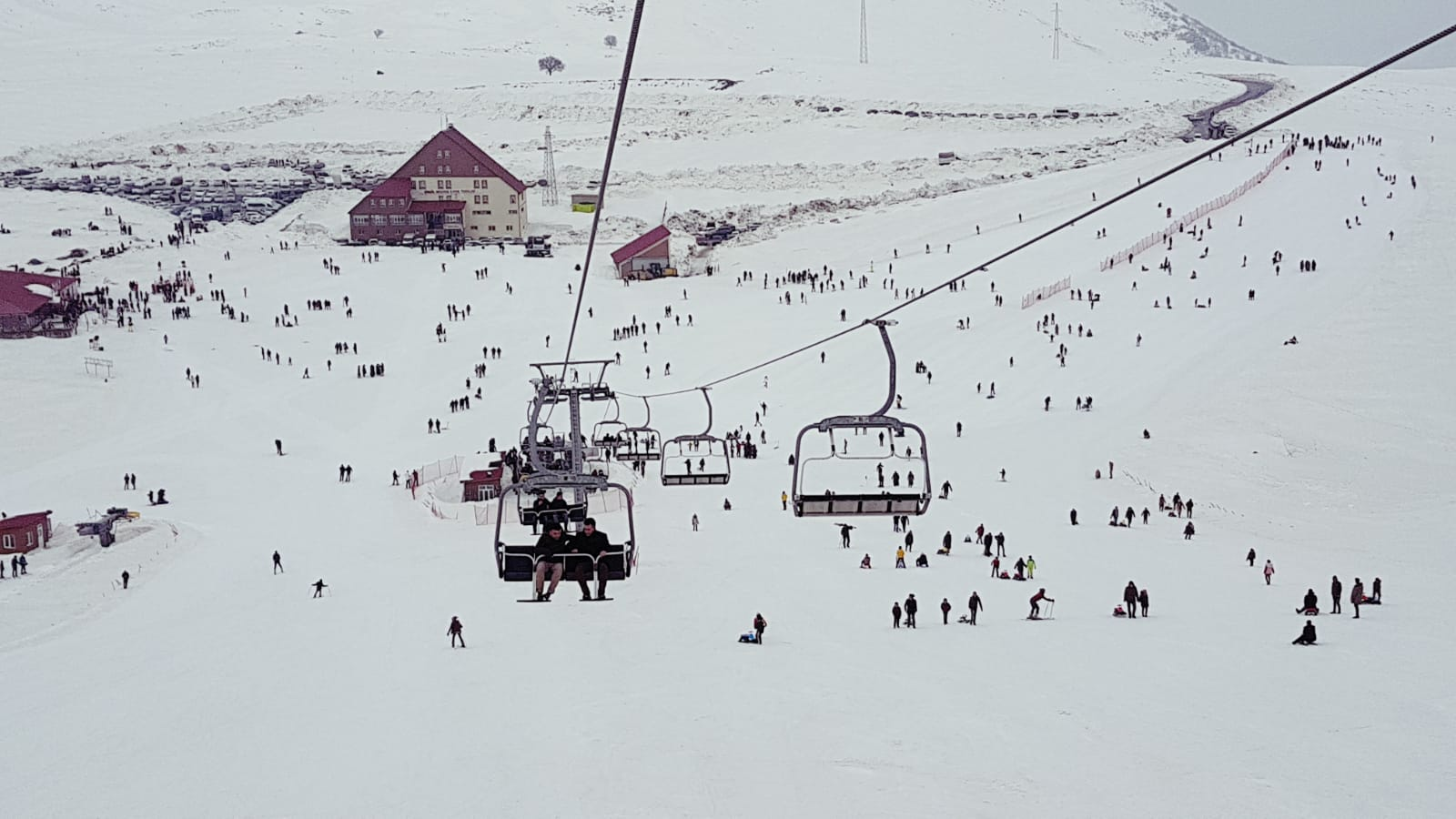
Haserek ski facilities

Bingöl, (Note: Armenian: Ճապաղջուր, romanized: Chapaghjur; Kurdish: Çewlik; Zazaki: Çewlîg) known as Çapakçur before 1944, is a city in Turkey. It is the seat of Bingöl Province and Bingöl District, and has a population of 133,423 (2022). The city has a Kurdish and Zaza (Kird) population.

== Etymology ==
One of the historical names for the city, Bingöl literally means thousand lakes in Turkish; however, there are no lakes of considerable size within the boundaries of the province. The name rather refers to many tarns found around the city.

== History ==
Bingöl is located in what was historically the region of Sophene (first an independent kingdom and later an Armenian and Roman province). The settlement is mentioned by its Armenian name, Chapaghjur (meaning "spread out water" in Armenian), by the 11th-century Armenian historian Stepanos Asoghik, who mentions it while describing the 995 Balu earthquake. Chapaghjur is sometimes identified with the Roman fortress-town of Citharizum (Ktarich in Armenian).

In the Middle Ages, Bingöl was known as Romanoupolis (Greek: Ῥωμανούπολις) after the Byzantine emperor Romanos I Lekapenos, who incorporated it into the Byzantine Empire in 942. It initially formed a subdivision of the thema of Mesopotamia, but it was later (c. 970) elevated into a separate theme.

Bingöl was ruled by the Suwaydid dynasty, a cadet branch of the Barmakids, from the 13th century until mid-Ottoman rule, autonomously from the Ottomans. Bingöl and the surrounding district had a large Armenian population prior to the Armenian genocide. Until the middle of the 20th century, the city was known as Çapakçur/Çabakçur, derived from its Armenian name. In 1944, the place was renamed Bingöl, meaning "thousand lakes" in Turkish.

=== Kurdish-Turkish conflict ===
Bingöl has been the site of several violent incidents of the Kurdish-Turkish conflict. On 23 October 2016, a car bombing targeting an armored police vehicle perpetrated by PKK militia members killed two police officers and injured 19 others. On 8 June 2018, a group of PKK militia members attacked a military station and killed one Turkish soldier while injuring three others.

== Geography ==
Bingöl is 144 kilometres (89 mi) east of Elazığ and is situated in the elevated region of Eastern Anatolia. Bingöl is a mountainous area with heights reaching 3000 metres, and the city itself is located about 1120 metres above sea level. The city is situated on a plateau overlooking the Sağyer, a small tributary of the Gonik (or Goynik) Stream, which itself joins the Murat River (one of the two main branches of the Euphrates) near Genç. The original center of the settlement, Çapakçur, is located in the valley of the Sağyer and is now an abandoned neighborhood of the modern city.

=== Climate ===
Bingöl has a humid continental climate (Köppen climate classification: Dsa, or Trewartha climate classification Dca), with hot, dry summers and cold, snowy winters. The driest months are July and August and the wettest is February and December.

Highest recorded temperature:42.0 °C (107.6 °F) on 26 July 2001
Lowest recorded temperature:−25.1 °C (−13.2 °F) on 27 February 1992

Climate data for Bingöl (1991–2020, extremes 1961–2025) (Station height:1139, coordinates:38°53′5″N 40°30′3″E)
Month	Jan	Feb	Mar	Apr	May	Jun	Jul	Aug	Sep	Oct	Nov	Dec	Year
Record high °C (°F)	13.8 (56.8)	16.2 (61.2)	22.3 (72.1)	30.3 (86.5)	33.9 (93.0)	38.0 (100.4)	42.0 (107.6)	41.3 (106.3)	39.4 (102.9)	32.1 (89.8)	25.5 (77.9)	22.8 (73.0)	42.0 (107.6)
Mean daily maximum °C (°F)	2.4 (36.3)	4.1 (39.4)	10.2 (50.4)	16.9 (62.4)	23.1 (73.6)	29.8 (85.6)	34.7 (94.5)	35.1 (95.2)	29.9 (85.8)	22.0 (71.6)	12.7 (54.9)	5.2 (41.4)	18.8 (65.8)
Daily mean °C (°F)	−2.1 (28.2)	−0.8 (30.6)	4.7 (40.5)	10.9 (51.6)	16.2 (61.2)	22.2 (72.0)	26.7 (80.1)	26.7 (80.1)	21.3 (70.3)	14.5 (58.1)	6.8 (44.2)	0.7 (33.3)	12.3 (54.1)
Mean daily minimum °C (°F)	−5.5 (22.1)	−4.6 (23.7)	0.4 (32.7)	5.8 (42.4)	10.2 (50.4)	15.0 (59.0)	19.3 (66.7)	19.1 (66.4)	13.9 (57.0)	8.6 (47.5)	2.2 (36.0)	−2.8 (27.0)	6.8 (44.2)
Record low °C (°F)	−23.2 (−9.8)	−21.6 (−6.9)	−20.3 (−4.5)	−9.2 (15.4)	1.0 (33.8)	3.5 (38.3)	8.8 (47.8)	7.8 (46.0)	4.2 (39.6)	−2.4 (27.7)	−15.0 (5.0)	−25.1 (−13.2)	−25.1 (−13.2)
Average precipitation mm (inches)	138.7 (5.46)	128.9 (5.07)	134.4 (5.29)	110.5 (4.35)	82.5 (3.25)	21.3 (0.84)	6.6 (0.26)	5.1 (0.20)	15.4 (0.61)	65.3 (2.57)	93.1 (3.67)	133.3 (5.25)	935.1 (36.81)
Average precipitation days	12.67	12.2	14.3	14.83	14.37	5.37	2	1.5	2.83	8.47	8.93	12.57	110
Average snowy days	10.7	9.0	4.5	0.7	0.1	0	0	0	0	0.1	1.2	5.6	31.9
Average relative humidity (%)	72.8	71.1	65.5	60.9	57.1	44.3	37.2	35.9	41.4	56.4	65	73.2	56.7
Mean monthly sunshine hours	105.4	124.3	148.8	165.0	213.9	270.0	285.2	275.9	240.0	189.1	135.0	102.3	2,254.9
Mean daily sunshine hours	3.4	4.4	4.8	5.5	6.9	9.0	9.2	8.9	8.0	6.1	4.5	3.3	6.2
Source 1: Turkish State Meteorological Service
Source 2: NOAA NCEI (humidity), Meteomanz(snowy days 2000-2024, extremes since 2024)

=== Earthquakes ===
On 1 May 2003, the whole area suffered from an earthquake with a magnitude of 6.4, leaving 177 dead and 520 injured. On 8 March 2010, the area suffered another earthquake, of magnitude 6.1, with its epicenter in Elazığ Province, 45 km (28 mi) west of Bingöl. On 14 June 2020, an earthquake with a magnitude of 5.8 occurred in the region, killing a village guard and injuring 21 others.

== Demographics ==
=== Ethnic background ===
In 1891, the kaza had 20,800 inhabitants: 16,465 Muslims and 4,385 Armenians.

Mother tongue, Çapakçur District, 1927 Turkish census
Turkish	Arabic	Kurdish	Circassian	Armenian	Unknown or other languages
975	1	9,416	–	–	–

Religion, Çapakçur District, 1927 Turkish census
Muslim	Armenian	Orthodox	Other Christian
10,395	–	–	–

The 1927 census data, recording Kurdish as the mother tongue of approximately 9,400 of the district's roughly 10,400 inhabitants, reflects the historically predominant linguistic character of the region. Zeyneloğlu, Sirkeci, and Civelek, in a spatial and demographic analysis of Kurdish language shift in Turkey published in Kurdish Studies, identify Bingöl as a province with a historically high concentration of Kurdish speakers, noting that even provinces located closer to predominantly Turkish-speaking areas, such as Bingöl, maintained substantial Kurdish-speaking populations through the mid-twentieth century.

=== Language ===
The population of Bingöl and its surrounding province has historically comprised speakers of two Kurdish language varieties: Kurmanji (Northern Kurdish) and Zazaki (also called Kird or Kirmanckî), the latter being spoken by a significant portion of the provincial population. Ishakoglu (2018) examines the province as a key site of contest over Kird/Zaza identity, noting that a majority of Bingöl Province's population is of Kurdish Zazaki background, with ongoing scholarly debate regarding the classification of Zazaki as a dialect of Kurdish or as a distinct but closely related Iranian language.

=== Population ===
Historical population

Year	Pop.	±% p.a.
1965	11,727	—
1970	17,220	+7.99%
1975	22,047	+5.07%
1980	28,146	+5.01%
1985	34,024	+3.87%
1990	41,590	+4.10%

Year	Pop.	±% p.a.
1997	67,022	+7.05%
2007	86,511	+2.59%
2012	98,424	+2.61%
2017	117,014	+3.52%
2022	133,423	+2.66%

Source: Population censuses (1965–1997) and TÜIK (2007–2022)

== Transportation ==
Bingöl is located on the highway connecting Istanbul and Ankara to the Lake Van basin via Malatya and Elazığ. It is connected by a 24-kilometre road to the Genç station of the Haydarpaşa-Tatvan railway line.

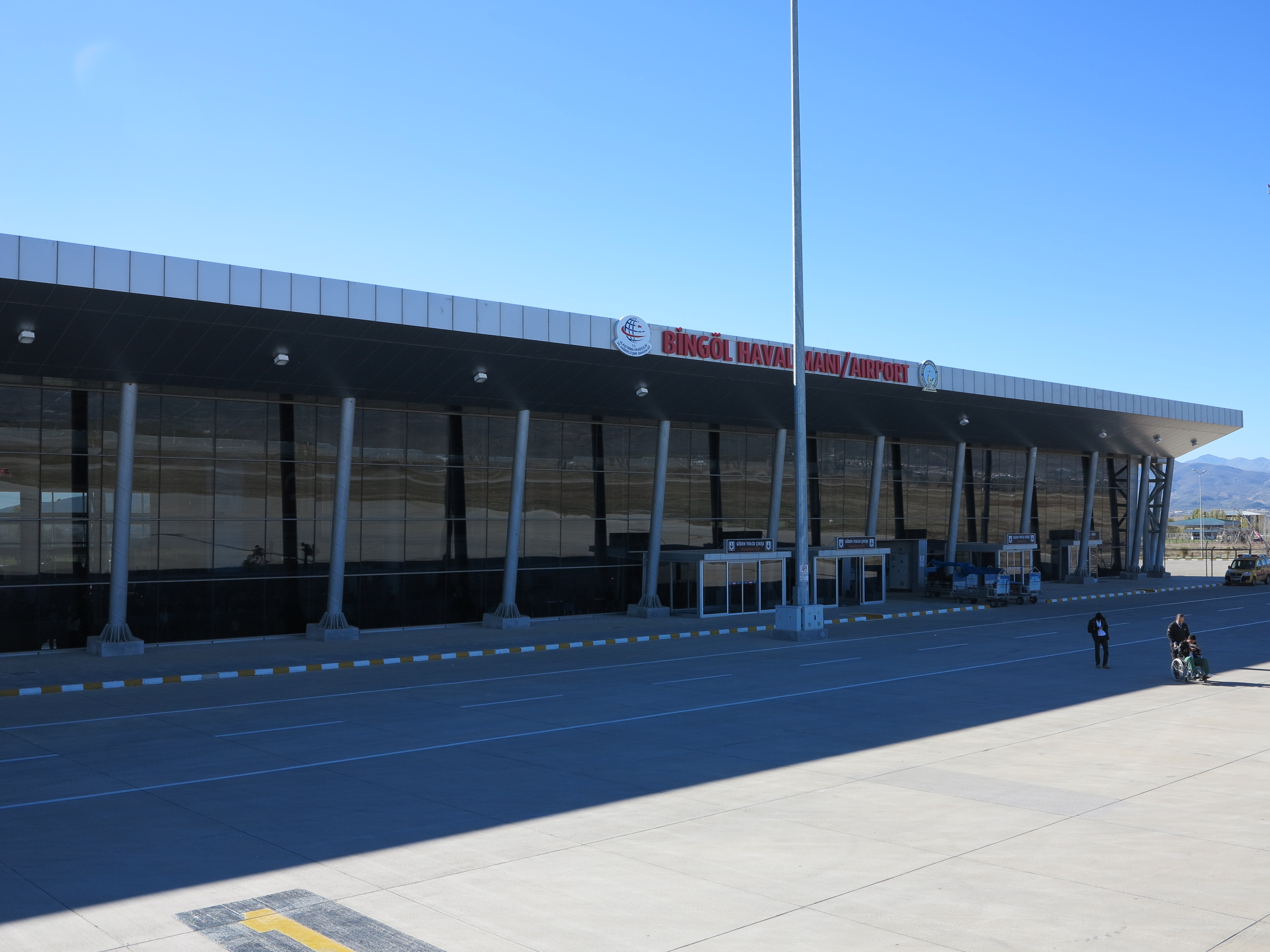
Bingöl Airport

Bingöl Airport opened on 12 July 2013. It has a passenger capacity of 500,000 a year.

== Education ==
Bingöl University opened on 29 May 2007. The university has nine faculties, six vocational schools and five institutes.

== Mayors of Bingöl ==
- 1977–1979 Hikmet Tekin (MHP)
- 1979–1980 Hilmi Elçi (Independent)
- 1984–1989 Mehmet Sıddık Börü (ANAP)
- 1989–1994 Selahattin Kaya (SHP)
- 1994–1995 Selahattin Aydar (Refah Party)
- 1995–1999 Bedri Tuğ (Refah Party, Fazilet Party)
- 1999–2004 Feyzullah Karaaslan (HADEP, DEHAP)
- 2004–2009 Hacı Ketenalp (AK Party)
- 2009–2014 Serdar Atalay (AK Party)
- 2014–2019 Yücel Barakazi (AK Party)
- 2019–present Erdal Arıkan (AK Party)
