= 1971 Bingöl earthquake =

Earthquake in Turkey

- Location within Turkey
- UTC time: 1971-05-22 16:44:02
- ISC event: 784837
- USGS-ANSS: ComCat
- Local date: 22 May 1971
- Local time: 18:44:02
- Magnitude: M_{w} 6.6–6.7, M_{s} 6.9
- Depth: 3–10 km (1.9–6.2 mi)
- Epicenter: 38.93°N 40.65°E
- Fault: East Anatolian Fault
- Type: Left Lateral Strike-slip
- Areas affected: Bingöl, Turkey
- Total damage: $US 5 million
- Max. intensity: MMI IX (Violent)
- Foreshocks: Yes
- Aftershocks: Yes
- Casualties: 755–1,000 killed, 1,200-1500 injured

The 1971 Bingöl earthquake was a M_{w} 6.6–6.7 earthquake that occurred at 18:44:02 local time on 22 May. It had a surface-wave magnitude of 6.9 and a maximum intensity of IX (Violent) on the Mercalli intensity scale, killing 755–1,000 people. Bingöl was largely destroyed, as well as many houses in the nearby Bingöl plain. Surface displacement of 38 km (24 mi) and various other surficial effects were directly caused by the earthquake.

== Tectonic setting ==
Map of the Anatolian Plate, featuring the East Anatolian Fault.

Most of Turkey lies on the Anatolian Plate. Movement of the plate is accommodated through four main faults: the Aegean extensional system (AES), the Cyprus Arc, the North Anatolian Fault (NAF), the East Anatolian Fault (EAF). The AES accommodates extensional forces between the Anatolian and Aegean Sea plates, and the Cyprus Arc accommodates convergence in the south between the African plate and the Anatolian Plate. In the north, the NAF accommodates the faulting between the Eurasian plate and the Anatolian plate and has produced prolific earthquakes such as the 1939 Erzincan earthquake. In the east, the Arabian plate and the Eurasian plate grind past each other, forming the EAF, the fault responsible for this earthquake. The EAF is a left-lateral strike slip fault which extends for 700 km (430 mi) and slips at a decreasing rate from east to west of 1–10 mm (0.039–0.394 in) per year.

== Earthquake ==
The earthquake struck near the city of Bingöl, Turkey at 18:44:02 local time. It was assigned a maximum Mercalli intensity of IX. Various seismic observatories reported different focal depths but it is agreed to be very shallow. The estimates are between 3 km (1.9 mi) and 10 km (6.2 mi). The focal mechanism showed left lateral strike-slip faulting, consistent with faulting along the East Anatolian Fault. Small foreshocks were strongly felt locally, and two magnitude 5.1 aftershocks were felt on the day of the mainshock. Aftershocks continued to be felt for a couple months after the mainshock. The mainshock ruptured along a 35 km (22 mi) × 12 km (7.5 mi) area of the East Anatolian Fault. A second rupture area measuring 20 km (12 mi) × 12 km (7.5 mi) was detected to the northeast. The two rupture areas produced maximum slips of 60 cm (24 in) and 40 cm (16 in), respectively. Minimal vertical displacement of 5–10 cm (2.0–3.9 in) was also found in parts of the southwestern portion of the rupture. Surface faulting was visible from Ormanardı in the southwest to Çobantaşı in the northeast over a distance of 38 km (24 mi).

== Impact ==
The earthquake killed at least 755 people and injured another 1,200–1500. Rubble masonry and reinforced concrete houses alike were severely damaged in the Bingöl plain. In Bingöl, 90 percent of buildings were destroyed, including the prison and hospital. Bridges crossing the Göynük and Murat rivers were closed to traffic due to damage caused by surficial effects of the earthquake. The total cost of damage was estimated at US$5 million. Sand boils formed at some ground cracks, and landslides and rockfalls were also observed. At least two people were killed in Palu, a town some 32.4 km (20.1 mi) west of Bingöl. About half of the 800 reported deaths came from villages outside Bingöl.

In response to the disaster, officials deployed a field hospital and 10 medical personnel from Elazig. In Erzurum, 1,500 tents were sent to the affected area. On 23 May, the governor of Elazig said the Eighth Army Corps mobilised doctors and a convoy to Bingöl. Officials brought mobile kitchens, tents, food and water. The Turkish Red Crescent said it received offer for assistance from the League of Red Cross Societies and Iran to which they said was not needed. Prime minister Nihat Erim, who visited Bingöl with the health, construction and interior ministers, said most people in the area lived in sun-dried brick homes, incapable of withstanding earthquakes.

== See also ==
- List of earthquakes in 1971
- List of earthquakes in Turkey

== Sources ==
- Ambraseys, Nicholas Neocles (December 1988). "Engineering seismology: Part II". Earthquake Engineering & Structural Dynamics. 17 (1): 51–105. doi:10.1002/eqe.4290170102.
- Aydan, Ö; Ulusay, R.; Miyajima, M. (July 2003). The Bingöl Earthquake Of May 1, 2003 (PDF) (Report). Japan Society of Civil Engineers. pp. 1–94.
- Ellul, Frederick; D'Ayala, Dina; Calayir, Yusuf (1 August 2004). The 1St Of May 2003, Bingol, Turkey, Earthquake, A Study Of The Performance Of The Building Stock (PDF). 13th World Conference on Earthquake Engineering. Vancouver, B.C., Canada.
- Gürsoy, Halil; Tatar, Orhan; Akpınar, Zafer; Polat, Ali; Mesci, Levent; Tunçer, Doğan (April 2013). "New observations on the 1939 Erzincan Earthquake surface rupture on the Kelkit Valley segment of the North Anatolian Fault Zone, Turkey". Journal of Geodynamics. 65: 259–271. Bibcode:2013JGeo...65..259G. doi:10.1016/j.jog.2012.06.002.
- Güvercin, Sezim Ezgi; Karabulut, Hayrullah; Konca, A Özgün; Doğan, Uğur; Ergintav, Semih (July 2022). "Active seismotectonics of the East Anatolian Fault". Geophysical Journal International. 230 (1): 50–69. doi:10.1093/gji/ggac045.
- Taymaz, T.; Yilmaz, Y.; Dilek, Y. (2007). "The geodynamics of the Aegean and Anatolia: introduction". Geological Society, London, Special Publications. 291: 1–16. doi:10.1144/SP291.1.
- Utkucu, Murat; Pinar, Ali; Alptekin, Ömer (2003). "Investigation of rupture history of the May 22, 1971, Bingöl earthquake obtained from the finite-fault inversion of the teleseismic P waveforms". Bull. Earth Sci. Appl. Res. Centre of Hacettepe University. 28: 65–79.
