= Karlıova =

Municipality in Bingöl Province, Turkey

- Municipality
- Location in Turkey
- Coordinates: 39°17′57″N 41°00′51″E
- Country: Turkey
- Province: Bingöl
- District: Karlıova

Government
  - Mayor: Veysi Bingöl (AKP)
- Population (2021): 9,016
- Time zone: UTC+3 (TRT)
- Website: www.karliova.bel.tr

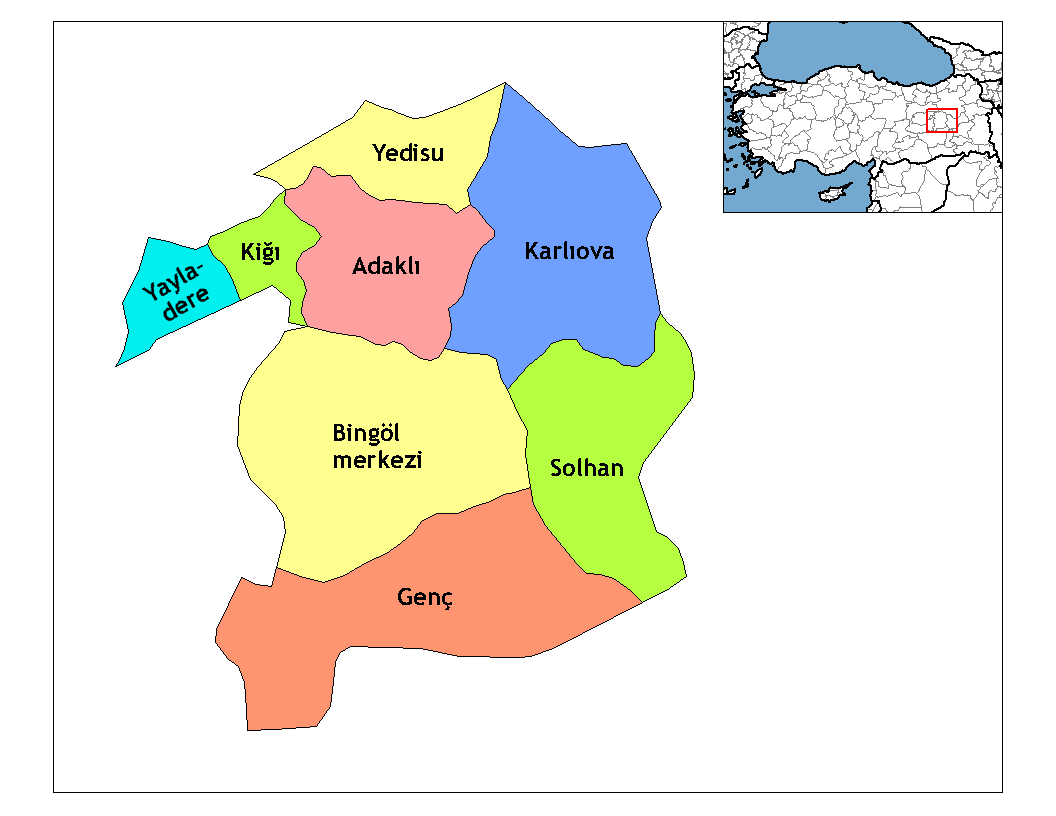
Map of districts in Bingol province

Karlıova (Kurdish: Kanîreş) is a town and seat of the Karlıova District in Bingöl Province of Turkey. The mayor is Veysi Bingöl (AKP). The town had a population of 9,016 in 2021 and is populated by Kurds.

The town is divided into the neighborhoods of Kale, Kanireş, Kanitaht, Seyrantepe, Turgut Özal and Yeşilyurt.

== Geography ==
Karlıova Basin is surrounded by Karagöl, Şeytan and Bingöl Mountains in the north, Şerafettin Mountains in the south and Turna Mountain in the west. The largest lake in Karlıova is Lake Bahri.

== See also ==
- Karlıova triple junction
- 1949 Karlıova earthquake
