= 2020 Elazığ earthquake =

Earthquake in Turkey

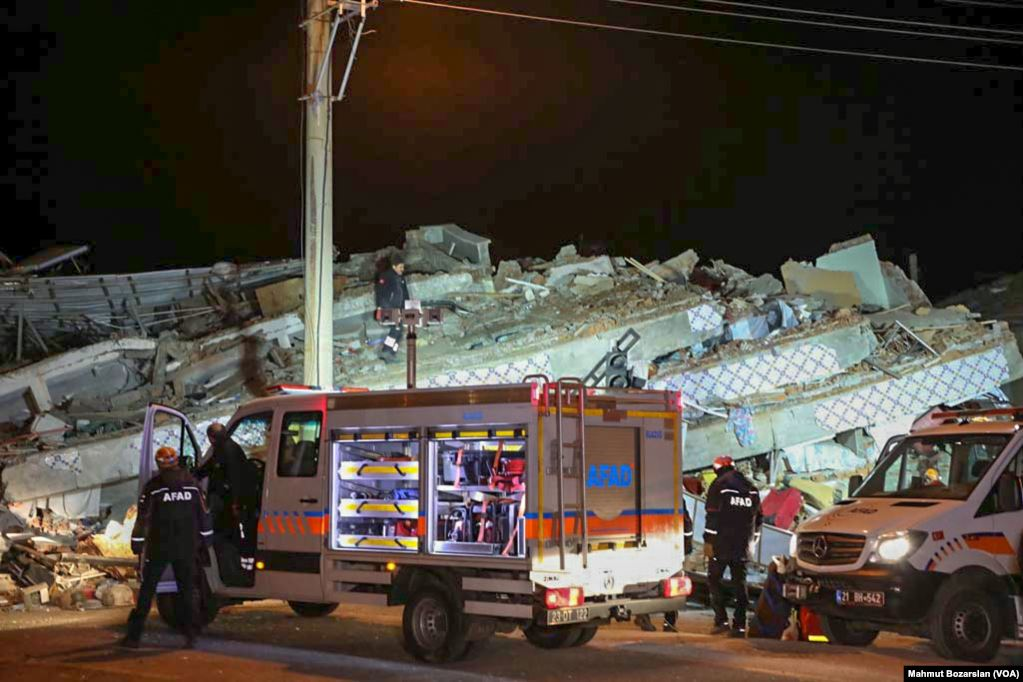
- Relief workers in Elazığ trying to reach survivors in a collapsed building

- Location within Turkey
- UTC time: 2020-01-24 17:55:14
- ISC event: 617204417
- USGS-ANSS: ComCat
- Local date: 24 January 2020
- Local time: 20:55 TRT (UTC+3:00)
- Duration: 40 seconds
- Magnitude: 6.7 M_{w}
- Depth: 10.0 km (6 mi)
- Epicentre: 38.390°N 39.081°E
- Fault: East Anatolian Fault
- Type: Strike-slip
- Areas affected: Turkey
- Max. intensity: MMI IX (Violent)
- Aftershocks: Numerous; 17 with a M_{w} 4.0 or greater Largest: M_{w} 5.1 at 16:30 UTC, 25 January 2020
- Casualties: 44 fatalities, 1,600+ injuries

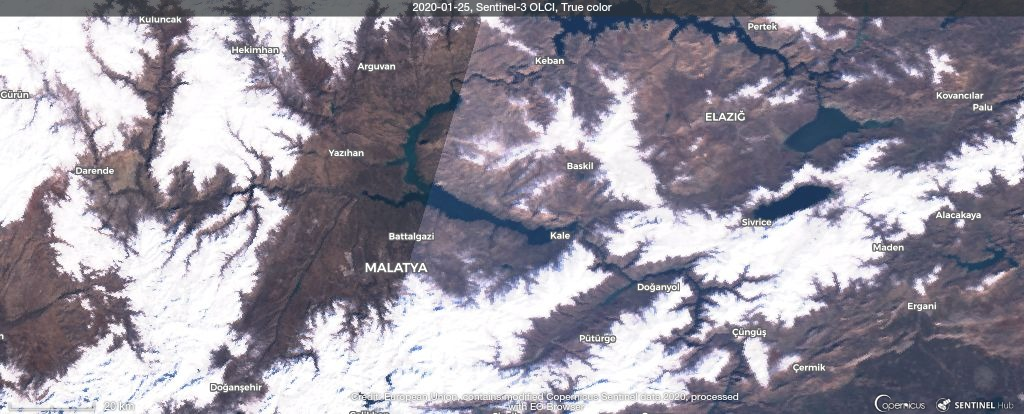
Satellite view of the Elazığ region.

The 2020 Elazığ earthquake occurred at 20:55 local time (17:55 UTC) on 24 January in Turkey. The magnitude of the earthquake was determined to be 6.7 M_{w}. The earthquake's epicentre was close to the town of Sivrice in Elazığ Province and felt in the neighbouring provinces of Diyarbakır, Malatya and Adıyaman, and the neighbouring countries of Armenia, Syria and Iran. Kandilli Observatory reported the magnitude of the earthquake as 6.5 M_{w}. A total of 41 people were killed and more than 1,600 were injured.

== Tectonic setting ==
Most of Turkey lies on the Anatolian Plate, which is being forced westwards by the collision between the Arabian plate and the Eurasian plate. This westward movement is accommodated by two large strike-slip fault zones, the west–east trending right lateral North Anatolian Fault in the north of the country and the SW-NE trending left lateral East Anatolian Fault towards the south-east. Movement on these two faults has been responsible for many large and damaging earthquakes historically. The most recent major earthquakes on the East Anatolian Fault were the 2003 Bingöl earthquake and the 2010 Elazığ earthquake. The 2023 Turkey–Syria earthquakes also occurred on this fault.

== Earthquake ==
Map of the Anatolian Plate, featuring the East Anatolian Fault.

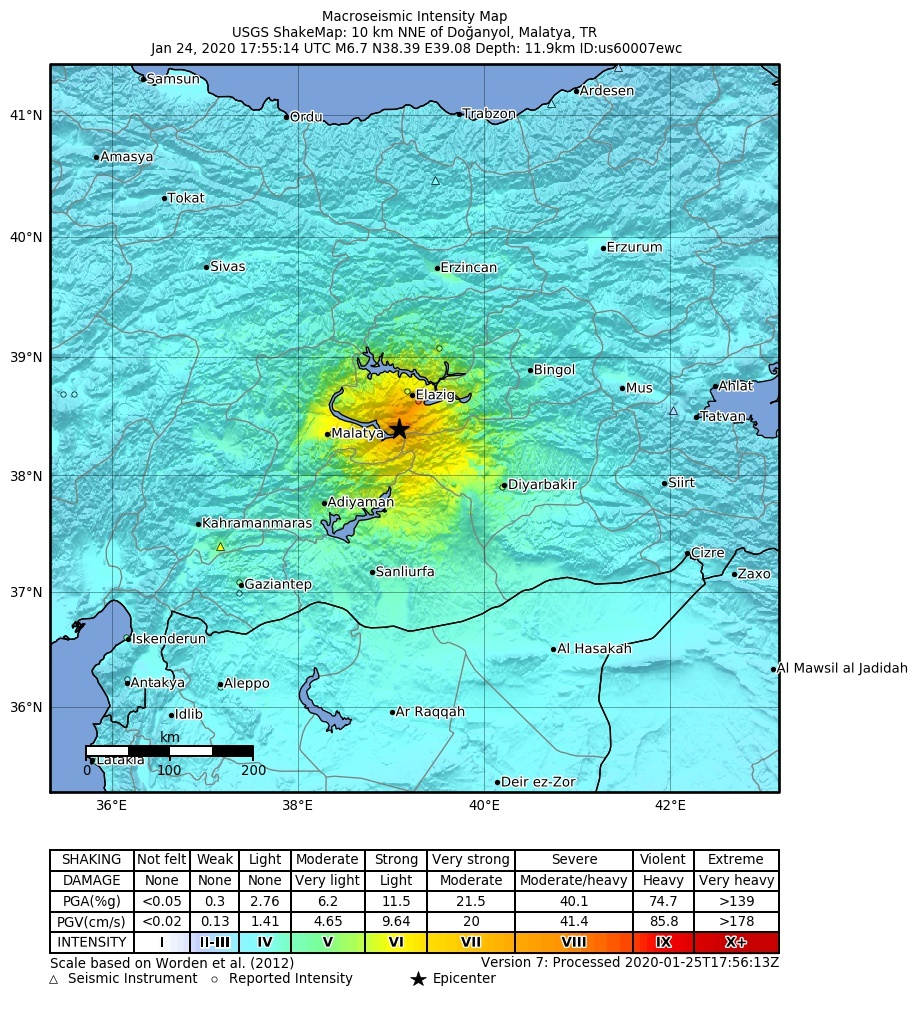
Map of Elazığ Province and surrounds, showing location and seismic intensity of quake. Star marks epicenter.

The earthquake had a magnitude of 6.7 M_{w} and a depth of 11.9 kilometres (7.4 mi) according to ANSS and 6.5 M_{w} and a depth of 5.0 kilometres (3.1 mi) according to the Kandilli Observatory. The duration of the earthquake was reported as 40 seconds. The observed focal mechanism and the epicentral location are consistent with the earthquake being caused by movement on the East Anatolian Fault. Many aftershocks were detected following the earthquake, among which 17 were reported to be of magnitude 4.0 or greater with the largest being a 5.1 M_{w} event at 16:30 UTC on 25 January.

The earthquake's epicentre was close to the town of Sivrice, 550 kilometres (340 mi) east of the Turkish capital Ankara. The town has 4,000 inhabitants, lying within an overall thinly populated region, and is adjacent to Lake Hazar.

== Damage ==
There was serious damage within 40 km of the epicentre, including the cities of Elazığ and Malatya. 19 towns and over 200 villages were also seriously impacted. Just in the two cities, 87 multistory buildings collapsed with another 1,287 being so damaged that they will have to be demolished. Thousands of other buildings outside the cities were seriously affected. All buildings in 25 of the villages are reported to be destroyed.

A total of 41 people were confirmed dead, the majority of whom were in Elazığ and the rest in Malatya. In addition, three people died due to heart attacks during the earthquake; one in each of Adıyaman, Diyarbakır, and Kahramanmaraş provinces. At least 1,607 people were reported to be injured, mostly within Elazığ province. 39 people were rescued from collapsed buildings. The earthquake interrupted a live broadcast of the local Edessa television channel. Dozens of wounded casualties were reported in the adjacent provinces of Adıyaman, Kahramanmaraş, Diyarbakır, Şanlıurfa and Batman. A prison in Adıyaman was damaged during the earthquake and subsequently evacuated. On 25 January, officials stated that more than 20 people are still trapped, with the number of people rescued reaching 42 so far, according to the BBC. An elderly woman was rescued after being trapped for 19 hours under the rubble. Thousands were temporarily housed in schools and sport centres across the region. Turkey's Interior Minister added that at least 15,000 people are sleeping in gymnasiums and schools, and more than 5,000 tents have been installed for the victims displaced by the earthquake. According to The Guardian, hundreds of people waited greatly concerned behind police barriers, with the hope of finding their missing relatives.

The Turkish Disaster and Emergency Management Authority deployed 400 search and rescue teams to the affected regions alongside relief supplies, totalling 3,699 personnel. The Turkish Red Crescent also mobilized hundreds of its personnel with emergency supplies to the region. Turkish Airlines announced additional flights to Elazığ from Ankara and Istanbul to assist in transporting aid workers. Turkey's military are also at the ready to assist, Turkish Interior Minister Süleyman Soylu stated. Telecom companies in the affected regions announced free access to internet and telephone services for residents. Rescue workers and survivors had to cope with night time temperatures dropping to −8 °C (18 °F). Turkish president Recep Erdoğan cancelled a scheduled attendance at the Foreign Economic Relations Board and visited the region on 25 January 2020 where he attended the funerals of a mother and son who died in the earthquake. After the funeral, Erdoğan was said to have visited hospitals where the victims of the quake were admitted, as well as locations of collapsed buildings. President Erdoğan stated earlier on Saturday, that the ministers of Interior, Health and Environment have been sent to areas affected by the quake, according to CNN. Furthermore, the Turkish president has assured that steel-framed houses will be built for the victims who lost their homes in the quake.

On Sunday, as the rescue teams began winding down their rescue operation, a mother and her young child were said to have been removed from beneath a collapsed building, according to The Guardian. They were believed to have been trapped under the building for 28 hours. During a news conference on Sunday, President Recep Tayyip Erdoğan stated that so far at least 45 people have been rescued from the rubble.

The local football team Elazığspor, withdrew from the 2019-20 2. Lig after the earthquake.

== International response ==
While Turkey primarily managed the disaster response domestically, several international entities offered support:

- World Health Organization (WHO) dispatched two experts to assist in coordinating health services and praised Turkey's swift and effective response.
- Greece extended an offer of assistance through its Foreign Minister, reflecting regional solidarity.

== See also ==
- 2020s in environmental history
- List of earthquakes in 2020
- List of earthquakes in Turkey
