= 2003 Bingöl earthquake =

- Location within Turkey
- UTC time: 2003-05-01 00:27:04
- ISC event: 6832154
- USGS-ANSS: ComCat
- Local date: 1 May 2003
- Local time: 03:27 local time
- Magnitude: 6.4 M_{w}
- Depth: 15 km (9.3 mi)
- Epicenter: 38.95°N 40.4°E
- Type: Strike-slip
- Areas affected: Turkey
- Max. intensity: MMI IX (Violent)
- Peak acceleration: 0.55 g
- Landslides: Yes
- Aftershocks: ≥6,700
- Casualties: 177 killed, 521 injured

An earthquake hit eastern Turkey with a moment magnitude of 6.4 and a maximum Mercalli intensity of IX (Violent) on 1 May 2003 at 03:27 local time. The epicenter of this strike-slip earthquake was in Bingöl Province, 15 km north of the city of Bingöl. At least 177 people were killed and 3,305 buildings collapsed or suffered heavy damage in the affected region. Eighty-four of the fatalities occurred when a dormitory block collapsed in a boarding school in Celtiksuyu.

== Tectonic setting ==
Most of Turkey lies on the Anatolian Plate, which is being forced westwards by the collision between the Arabian plate and the Eurasian plate. This westward movement is accommodated by two large strike-slip fault zones, the west–east trending right lateral North Anatolian Fault in the north of the country and the SW-NE trending left lateral East Anatolian Fault towards the south-east. Movement on these two faults have been responsible for many large and damaging earthquakes historically.

== Earthquake ==
The earthquake occurred on May 1, 2003, with a depth of 15 km (9.3 mi). It was a strike-slip event, lasting about 17 seconds with a magnitude of 6.4. It occurred at 3:27 am local time. The strike-slip fault responsible was not the East Anatolian Fault; it ruptured a right-lateral strike-slip fault perpendicular to the East Anatolian Fault.

Numerous seismically induced ground deformations, displacements and ruptures were observed in the epicentral area. According to these observations, a few surface ruptures were located between the villages of Hanoçayırı and Sudüğünü, with a vertical drop of 40–65 cm (1.31–2.13 ft) observed at a nearby field. By 8 May, there were over 6,700 aftershocks, including 1,962 on the day of the mainshock.

== Damage ==
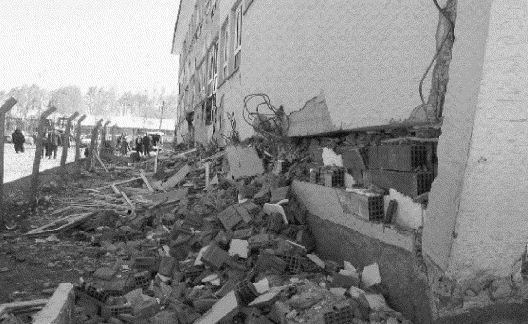
Picture of a damaged building due to the earthquake

The earthquake damaged hundreds of buildings made of reinforced concrete and masonry. Many school buildings constructed within the last six years were heavily damaged. A total of 177 people were killed; 84 of the fatalities occurred when a dormitory block collapsed in a boarding school. A total 8,417 houses being damaged, of which 305 collapsed, 3,000 heavily damaged, 2,566 moderately damaged, and 2,546 slightly damaged. In the city of Bingöl, 6,570 buildings were damaged, 570 of them seriously, including 90% of schools, four of which collapsed; the school where the dormitory block collapsed was a 5-story building. Three hospitals in the city were also damaged. The majority of destroyed or seriously damaged buildings were constructed using unreinforced concrete, which are prone to collapsing in strong tremors.

== See also ==
- List of earthquakes in 2003
- List of earthquakes in Turkey
