= 1995 Paphos earthquake =

Earthquake in Cyprus

- Σεισμός Πάφου 1995
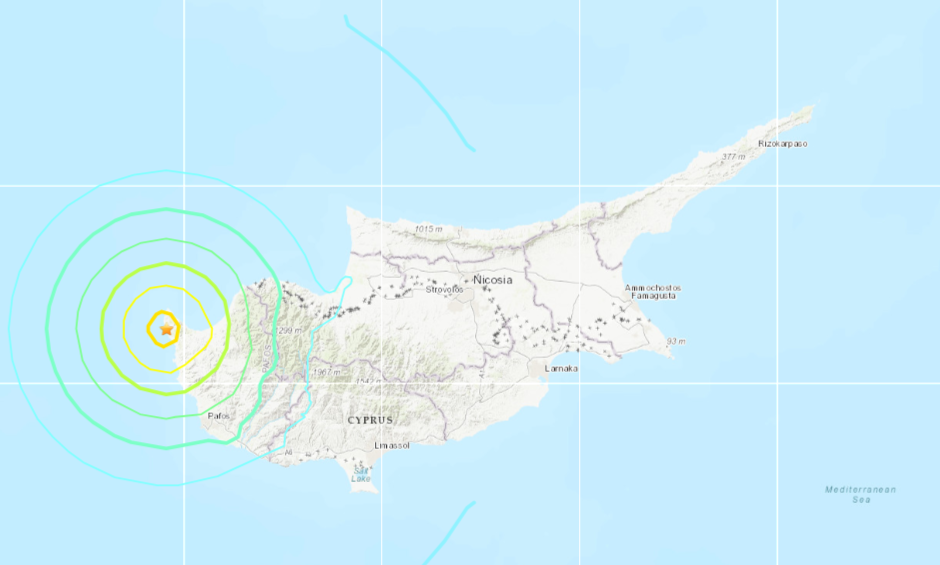
- Map of Cyprus and the epicenter of the earthquake

- Location within Cyprus
- UTC time: 1995-02-23 21:03:01
- ISC event: 121165
- USGS-ANSS: ComCat
- Local date: 24 February 1995
- Local time: 00:03:01 EEST (UTC+2)
- Magnitude: M_{wr} 5.9
- Depth: 10.0 km (6.2 mi)
- Epicenter: 35.046°N 32.279°E
- Areas affected: Cyprus
- Total damage: Homes destroyed or severely damaged
- Max. intensity: MMI VII (Very strong)
- Tsunami: None
- Landslides: None
- Aftershocks: M_{wr} 5.2, M_{wr} 4.8
- Casualties: 2 fatalities, 5 injuries

On 24 February 1995, at 12:03 AM EEST (21:03 UTC on 23 February), a M_{wr} 5.9 earthquake struck Paphos District in Cyprus, with an epicenter located about 40 km (25 mi) northwest of Paphos. The earthquake was felt throughout all of Cyprus, as well as parts of northern Israel, Lebanon, and Turkey. It caused moderate damage to the surrounding area; homes had little to severe damage. Two people died and five were injured as a result of this earthquake.

== Tectonic setting ==
The Island of Cyprus was created from the uplift of the Cyprus Arc, which was caused by the collision of the Anatolian Plate and the African plate. To the East of the Cyprus Arc lies the Dead Sea Transform, and to the west is the Hellenic Arc. The East Anatolian Fault sits just northeast of the island of Cyprus.

== Earthquake ==
The earthquake had a moment magnitude of 5.9 and a depth of 10 km (6 mi). Its epicenter was just 10 km (6 mi) west of the village of Neo Chorio, with its exact location found at 35.046°N 32.279°E, about 40 km (25 mi) northwest of Paphos. Tremors were felt all across the island from Nicosia in the east to Limassol in the south.

Over 70 aftershocks were reported, the strongest of which had a magnitude of 5.2 and took place just 40 minutes after the initial earthquake.

The 1996 Paphos Earthquake struck the near the same region that this earthquake was located.

== Impact ==
Fifty homes were completely destroyed as a result of the earthquake, as well as another 70 homes being seriously damaged and 500 other homes slightly damaged in the Nicosia and Paphos regions. 20 masonry homes were also destroyed as a result. Two people were killed due to a building collapse and five were injured as a result from the earthquake.

== See also ==
- 2022 Cyprus earthquake
- Cyprus Arc
- Geology of Cyprus
- List of earthquakes in Cyprus
- List of earthquakes in 1995
