= List of castles in Cyprus =

This is a list of castles in Cyprus.

== Castles/Fortresses ==
| Name | District | Era | Image | Coordinates |
|---|---|---|---|---|
| Paphos Castle; Κάστρο της Πάφου / Baf Kalesi | Paphos | 11th century | | 34.75367°N 32.406911°E |
| Saranta Kolones; Κάστρο Σαράντα Κολώνες / Saranta Kolones Kalesi | Paphos | 13th century | | 34.757656°N 32.409644°E |
| Kouklia Tower; Πύργος Κουκλιών / Kuklia Kulesi | Paphos | 12th century | | 34.705860°N 32.573100°E |
| Episkopi Castle; Κάστρο Επισκοπής / Episkopi Kalesi | Limassol | 12th century | | 34.664204°N 32.905016°E |
| Kolossi Castle; Κάστρο του Κολοσσιού | Limassol | 13th century | | 34.665273°N 32.933957°E |
| Limassol Castle; Κάστρο Λεμεσού / Limasol Kalesi | Limassol | 12th century | | 34.6722°N 33.0415°E |
| Choirokoitia Castle; Κάστρο Χοιροκητίας / Choirokoitia Kalesi | Larnaca | 13th century | | |
| Alaminos Tower; Ο Πύργος της Αλαμινού / Aleminyo Gözetleme Kulesi | Larnaca | 14th century | This is an image of Alaminos tower. The tower is grey and rectangular. | 34.8067858°N 33.4368011°E |
| Tower of Regina (Kiti Tower); Ο Πύργος της Ρήγαινας / Bahçeler Kiti Kulesi | Larnaca | 16th century | | 34.8360755°N 33.5889224°E |
| Larnaca Castle; Κάστρο Λάρνακας / Larnaka Kalesi | Larnaca | 12th century | | 34.910271°N 33.637694°E |
| Pyla Tower; Ο Πύργος της Πύλας / Pile Kulesi | Larnaca | 16th century | | 35.009°N 33.69°E |
| Othello Castle; Κάστρο της Oθέλλου / Othello Kulesi | Famagusta (Gazimağusa) | 14th century | | 35.127688°N 33.943239°E |
| Siguri Castle; Κάστρο Σιγούρης/ Sigouri Kalesi | Famagusta | 12th century | | |
| Potamias tower Πύργος Ποταμιάς / Potamia Kalesi | Nicosia | 14th century | | |
| La Cava Castle; Κάστρο Λα Κάβα / La Cava Kalesi | Nicosia | 12th century | | 35.135186°N 33.410197°E |
| Gastria Castle; Κάστρο Γαστριών / Gastria Kalesi | Famagusta | 12th century | | 35.324033°N 33.979498°E |
| Kantara Castle; Κάστρο της Καντάρας / Kantara Kalesi | Famagusta (İskele) | 10th century | | 35.4064°N 33.9233°E |
| Buffavento Castle; Kάστρο Βουφαβέντο / Buffavento Kalesi | Kyrenia (Girne) | 11th century | | 35.287456°N 33.410185°E |
| Kyrenia Castle; Κάστρο της Κερύνειας / Girne Kalesi | Kyrenia (Girne) | 7th century | | 35.341389°N 33.322222°E |
| Saint Hilarion Castle; Κάστρο του Αγίου Ιλαρίωνα / Saint Hilarion Kalesi | Kyrenia (Girne) | 10th century | | 35.3123°N 33.2808°E |
| Profitis Elias Castle; Κάστρο Προφήτη Ηλία / Profitis Elias Kalesi | Kyrenia | 12th century | | 35.3123°N 33.2808°E |
| Akaki Castle; Κάστρο του Ακακίου / Akaki Kalesi | Nicosia | 14th century | | 35.305536°N 33.228778°E |
| Pyrgos Tiliria Tower | Nicosia | 13th century | | |
| Muti tis Rigena Tower | Paphos | 13th century | | |

== Map of castles and forts ==
Map of castles in Cyprus
Republic of Cyprus Control
Northern Cyprus Control
UN Control
British bases

== See also ==
- List of castles
