= 1953 Paphos earthquake =

Earthquake in Cyprus

- Location within Cyprus
- UTC time: 1953-09-10 04:06:04
- ISC event: 891997
- USGS-ANSS: ComCat
- Local date: 10 September 1953
- Local time: 07:05 EEST
- Magnitude: M_{w} 6.3, M_{s} 6.5
- Epicenter: 34.741°N 32.335°E (Note: Coordinates provided by the International Seismological Centre catalog. For a detailed analysis of the epicenters, see Earthquake section.)
- Areas affected: British Cyprus
- Total damage: >₤2,000,000
- Max. intensity: MMI X (Extreme)
- Tsunami: Yes
- Casualties: 40 dead, 100 injured

The 1953 Paphos earthquake struck off the coast of Paphos on Cyprus at 07:05 EEST on 10 September. The earthquake with a magnitude of M_{w} 6.3 or M_{s} 6.5, occurred at a depth of 20 km (12 mi). It was caused by normal faulting at a shallow depth; further analysis of seismic data revealed a doublet earthquake with two similarly sized subevents 50 km (31 mi) apart and separated by 8 seconds.

In Paphos District, the earthquake killed 40 people, injured 100 and made another 4,000 homeless. The town of Paphos and 158 villages were severely damaged while five were completely destroyed. Damage from the earthquake was estimated at more than ₤2,000,000. An aftershock on 18 September also caused further damage. The mainshock triggered a non-destructive tsunami observed at Paphos.

== Geological setting ==
Cyprus is located on a plate boundary between the Anatolian and African plates known as the Cyprus Arc. While subduction occurs along the Hellenic Trench west of the arc, the Cyprus Arc itself involves continental collision, though whether subduction along the arc is active remains debated by geologists. In this part of the northeastern Mediterranean Sea, the Cyprus Arc, East Anatolian, and Dead Sea fault zones form a triple junction. Seismicity in the region was low during the 20th century, but large earthquakes have occurred in the past with a recurrence interval of 200–350 years.

Although the tectonic regime is compressional, there are large extensional structures near Cyprus. Between southeast Turkey and Cyprus, two extensional basins, the Adana–Cilicia and the Iskenderun–Latakia–Mesaoria Basins, bound the Kyrenia–Misis–Andirin Ridge. This partially submarine ridge, part of the Kyrenia-Misis-Andirin Unit, has been interpreted as a large flower structure. In addition, small along-strike variations in the plate boundary west of the triple junction influence whether extension or compression occurs despite its dominant strike-slip motion.

== Earthquake ==
The earthquake had a moment magnitude of 6.3 or surface-wave magnitude of 6.5, and struck offshore, 9 km (5.6 mi) from Paphos at 07:06 EEST on 10 September, at a depth of 20 km (12 mi).

A discrepancy between instrumental seismic data and macroseismic (Note: Non-instrumental aspect of seismology related to an earthquake's effect on people, objects and the environment) effects led seismologists Nicholas Ambraseys and Robin Adams to further analyse the observation readings. They inferred that the earthquake was caused by normal faulting. While the International Seismological Summary earthquake catalog published one mainshock centered 15 km (9.3 mi) offshore, southwest of Cyprus, the macroseismic effects suggest a macroseismic epicenter onshore, east of the instrumental one. Additionally, instrumental records indicate 2 episodes of initial P wave arrival 10 seconds apart, leading to an inference that the mainshock was a doublet earthquake involving two events 8 seconds and 50 km (31 mi) apart. The second event was as large or possibly larger than the first. Their surface-wave magnitudes were M_{s} 6.0 and 6.1, respectively.

The focal mechanism of the earthquake is poorly constrained with two solutions plausible. The first solution is normal faulting on either an east-striking fault dipping 76° north or a northwest-striking fault dipping 22° southwest. The other is strike-slip faulting on a north–northeast trending, right- or northeast trending left-lateral fault. Both solutions are consistent with possible movements on two shallow normal faults trending north–northwest and east–northeast, and dipping 70° west and 70° south, respectively.

== Impact ==
The earthquake killed 40 people, injured 100 others, and left another 4,000 homeless in Paphos District. At least 158 villages were severely damaged while the villages of Stroumbi, Axylou, Kithasi, Lapithiou and Phasoula, were destroyed. In Paphos, 171 homes were destroyed and 1,289 were damaged. The damage in villages was primarily caused by imminent landslides and ground fractures, particularly in marl or scree areas. Some areas although not subject to severe shaking, sustained damage from massive ground subsidence. Soil liquefaction occurred along the beach in Avdimou and Vassa in Limassol District. Several homes in Limassol were also cracked.

A maximum Modified Mercalli intensity of X (Extreme) was assigned. Across the island, the homes of 33,000 people were damaged, destroyed, or rendered uninhabitable. The total cost of damage to homes and public infrastructure was estimated at more than £2,000,000, with damage in Paphos accounting for £850,000. (Note: Monetary value of the Cypriot pound in 1953)

Small, non-destructive, tsunami waves were observed along the coast of Paphos, likely the result of coastal landslides. Landslides damaged some roads, and rain in the aftermath worsened the damage. In several small bridges, their support structures were displaced. The shaking was felt as far as Beirut, Lebanon; northern Israel; between Port Said and Damietta in Egypt; and Turkey. The aftershock sequence lasted one month; on 18 September, a mb 5.5 aftershock caused additional damage in Paphos.

In the immediate aftermath, doctors and police from Nicosia arrived in Paphos to provide assistance. British Air Force and Army supplied medical equipment and ambulances. The British government distributed about 6,300 marquees and tents as part of immediate assitance while the British Red Cross provided blankets and clothes. The Armed Forces Service stocks provided most of the 4,000 tents while the remaining were supplied by the Air Force and Navy. Donors in the United Kingdom raised more than £10,000 for the Cyprus Government Office via broadcast and appeals.

== See also ==
- List of earthquakes in 1953
- List of earthquakes in Cyprus
