= 2022 Cyprus earthquake =

Magnitude 6.6 earthquake in the Mediterranean Sea

- Location within Mediterranean Location within Cyprus
- UTC time: 2022-01-11 01:07:48
- ISC event: 621684247
- USGS-ANSS: ComCat
- Local date: 11 January 2022
- Local time: 03:07 EET
- Duration: 20 seconds
- Magnitude: 6.6 M_{w}
- Depth: 21 km (13 mi)
- Epicenter: 35.227°N 31.944°E
- Fault: Cyprus arc
- Type: Thrust
- Areas affected: Cyprus, Turkey, Egypt, Lebanon, Israel, Greece
- Total damage: Minor
- Max. intensity: MMI VI (Strong)
- Tsunami: 10 cm (0.33 ft)
- Casualties: 3 dead, 1 injured

An earthquake struck west of Paphos, Cyprus on 11 January 2022, with a moment magnitude of 6.6. The earthquake was the largest tremor to occur in the Mediterranean Sea since the 2003 Boumerdès earthquake, and the largest to occur in Cyprus since 1996.

== Tectonic setting ==
Cyprus is located in a complex zone of a boundary between the Anatolian and African Plates. These two plates are colliding along the Cyprus Arc, a tectonic boundary that runs south of the island. This subduction zone is offset by a small transform fault known as the Paphos Transform Fault. This plate boundary, along with the Dead Sea Transform and East Anatolian Fault Leads to motion of the African and Arabian Plates. This has resulted in moderately destructive, occasional earthquakes, including a magnitude 7.0–7.5 in 1222 which severely impacted the island and generated a large tsunami.

== Earthquake ==
The earthquake was the largest in Cyprus since 1996, and was felt across the island as well as Turkey, Greece, Egypt, Israel and Lebanon. The earthquake had a thrust focal mechanism and was centred about 50 km (31 mi) from the coast.

== Impact ==
=== Cyprus ===
Several structures received minor damage and objects fell from shelves in the Paphos and Nicosia Districts. In Kallepeia, at least 1,586 chickens were killed in a stampede caused by them panicking.

=== Egypt ===
In Damietta, the earthquake may have led to the collapse of a four-storey apartment several hours later, killing three people and injuring another. Two of the victims were men while another body had yet to be identified.

== See also ==
- List of earthquakes in Cyprus
- List of earthquakes in Egypt
- List of earthquakes in 2022
