= List of World Heritage Sites in Cyprus =

World Heritage Sites in Cyprus

The United Nations Educational, Scientific and Cultural Organization (UNESCO) designates World Heritage Sites of outstanding universal value to cultural or natural heritage which have been nominated by countries which are signatories to the UNESCO World Heritage Convention, established in 1972. Cultural heritage consists of monuments (such as architectural works, monumental sculptures, or inscriptions), groups of buildings, and sites (including archaeological sites). Natural heritage consists of natural features (physical and biological formations), geological and physiographical formations (including habitats of threatened species of animals and plants), and natural sites which are important from the point of view of science, conservation, or natural beauty. The Republic of Cyprus accepted the convention on 14 August 1975, making its sites eligible for inclusion on the list.

As of 2021, there are three World Heritage Sites in Cyprus, all of which are cultural sites. The first site to be listed was Paphos in 1980. In 1985, the Painted Churches in the Troodos Region were listed. The original nomination included nine churches, an additional one was added to the site in 2001. The most recent site added to the list was Choirokoitia in 1998 (with a minor boundary modification taking place in 2012). In 2010, all three sites in Cyprus were given enhanced protection status by the Committee for the Protection of Cultural Property in the Event of Armed Conflict. In addition, Cyprus also maintains eleven properties on its tentative list, six of which are associated with the Troodos Ophiolite.

== World Heritage Sites ==
UNESCO lists sites under ten criteria; each entry must meet at least one of the criteria. Criteria i through vi are cultural, and vii through x are natural.

World Heritage Sites
Site	Image	Location (district)	Year listed	UNESCO data	Description
Paphos	A colorful mosaic showing various people.	Paphos	1980	79; iii, vi (cultural)	A serial archaeological property comprising three components across two geographic locations: Kato Paphos (Site I) and Kouklia (Site II). The Kouklia site includesPalaepaphos, established c. 1700 BC, and the remains of the Sanctuary of Aphrodite founded c. 1200 BC. The Kato Paphos site contains the ancient Hellenistic and Roman city of Nea Paphos founded in the late 4th century BC and the subterranean necropolis of Tafoi ton Vasileon ("Tombs of the Kings").
Painted Churches in the Troodos Region	Fresco in Pedoulas of Constantine and his mother	Limassol and Nicosia	1985	351bis; ii, iii, iv (cultural)	This site comprises ten rural churches and monasteries built in the Troodos Mountains from the 11th to the 16th century. Churches, such as Panagia tou Araka and Church of St. Nicholas of the Roof, are richly decorated with murals. They document over 500 years of Byzantine and post-Byzantine painting and serve as examples of the development of styles under international influences. Nine churches were originally listed in 1985, one more church was added in 2001, and an additional one is considered on the tentative list.
Choirokoitia	Small white circular huts with flat roof.	Larnaca	1998	848bis; ii, iii, iv (cultural)	Choirokoitia is one of the most important prehistoric sites in the eastern Mediterranean. It was occupied between the 7th and 4th millennium BCE, in the Neolithic period. The settlement consisted of circular houses built from mudbrick and stone with flat roofs, and it was protected by successive walls. The agricultural society was aceramic (without pottery). Among the findings were flint and bone tools, animal and plant remains, stone vessels, and anthropomorphic figurines in stone (one in clay). Only part of the site has been excavated. A minor boundary modification took place in 2012.

== Tentative list ==
In addition to the sites inscribed on the World Heritage List, member states can maintain a list of tentative sites that they may consider for nomination. Nominations for the World Heritage List are only accepted if the site was previously listed on the tentative list. As of 2021, Cyprus recorded eleven sites on its tentative list.

Tentative sites
Site	Image	Location (district)	Year listed	UNESCO criteria	Description
Church of Panayia Chrysokourdaliotissa, Kourdali		Nicosia	2002	ii, iii, iv (cultural)	The church of Panayia Chrysokourdaliotissa with paintings from the early 16th century in the Italo-Byzantine style is considered as an extension to the Painted Churches in the Troodos Region.
The rural settlement of Fikardou	Old houses with red roofs, a hill in the background.	Nicosia	2002	ii, iii, iv, v (cultural)	The village of Fikardou is a traditional rural settlement in a mountain environment. It preserves the architecture and characteristics from the 18th and 19th centuries.
Mathiatis South		Nicosia	2002	(mixed)	This site is a part of the Troodos Ophiolite, a 90 million year old exposed fragment of the oceanic crust that has been extremely well preserved. The area was an important mining site, as indicated by the galleries and adits from the Roman times.
Kionia		Nicosia	2002	viii, ix (natural)	This site is a part of the Troodos Ophiolite. Kionia is an example of a sheeted dyke complex that allows studies of the spreading processes and hydrothermal alteration of the oceanic crust.
Khandria		Limassol	2002	viii, ix (natural)	This site is a part of the Troodos Ophiolite. Khandria demonstrates the magmatic processes in the oceanic crust, with the existence of small multiple magma chambers at spreading and ridges.
Troodos, Mt. Olympus	Mountain covered with snow	Limassol	2002	viii, ix (natural)	This site is a part of the Troodos Ophiolite. In Mount Olympus, the lower part of the oceanic crustal and upper mantle sequences are well exposed and lower crustal and mantle processes can be studied and demonstrated.
Malounta Bridge		Nicosia	2002	viii, ix (natural)	This site is a part of the Troodos Ophiolite. In this site, rock outcrops along the Akaki Canyon walls and its tributary give excellent examples of both the lavas and structures at the top of oceanic crust.
Klirou Bridge		Nicosia	2002	viii, ix (natural)	This site is a part of the Troodos Ophiolite and is located close to the Malounta Bridge. It provides an excellent example of how seafloor spreading takes place with dyke swarms showing dyke-indyke intrusion between lava screens.
Agioi Varnavas and Ilarion at Peristerona (Five-domed churches)	Stone church with domes and a spire.	Nicosia	2004	ii, iii, iv (cultural)	A five-domed church of St. Barnabas and St. Hilarion
Church of Panagia Aggeloktisti	Stone church, front view.	Larnaca	2015	i, ii, iii, iv, vi (cultural)	The church of Panagia Aggeloktisti was built in the 11th century over the ruins of a 5th-century basilica, with additional chapels being added in the following centuries. The church is important in view of its decoration, including a 6th-century wall mosaic (the only such mosaic that has been preserved in Cyprus), as well as wall paintings from the 11th century and a collection of icons.
Hala Sultan Tekke and the Larnaka Salt Lake Complex	Mosque in stone, a minaret and a shrine in front.	Larnaca	2016	iii, iv, vi, ix, x (mixed)	The Salt Lake Complex comprises four salt lakes and the surrounding wetlands. The area is important especially as a stopover and wintering spot for migrating birds. In addition, the salt lakes were exploited for their salt from the Roman times to the 20th century. Hala Sultan Tekke is an important mosque that was built by the Ottomans in the 19th century. Muslim tradition holds that this was the burial place of Umm Haram, who joined the Arab raid on Cyprus and died there in 649 AD.

== See also ==
- List of Intangible Cultural Heritage elements in Cyprus
- Tourism in Cyprus
