= List of earthquakes in Cyprus =

Notable earthquakes in the history of Cyprus include the following:

Date	EET	Area	Coordinates	Mag.	MMI	Deaths	Injuries	Comments
15 CE		Salamis	35.2°N 34°E					Extreme damage
76 CE		Paphos	34.8°N 32°E		X			Severe damage
1222-05-11	08:15	Paphos	34.7°N 32.6°E	7.0–7.5	IX			Tsunami
1896-06-29	20:48	Limassol						Moderate damage
1953-09-10	06:05	Paphos	35°N 32.5°E	6.5 M_{s}	X	40	100	Tsunami
1995-02-23	23:03	Paphos	35.05°N 32.28°E	5.9 M_{w}	VII	2	5	
1996-10-09	16:10	Paphos	34.56°N 32.13°E	6.8 M_{w}	VII	2	20	
1999-08-11	07:27	Limassol	34.79°N 32.94°E	5.6 M_{w}	VII		15	Buildings damaged / landslides
2022-01-11	02:07	Paphos	35.146°N 31.910°E	6.6 M_{w}	VI	3	1	Minor damage
2024-12-24	13:22	22 miles from Paphos	34.68°N 32.05°E	4.5 M_{w}	V	N/A	N/A	Damage unknown
2025-11-12	03:07	Paphos	34.79°N 32.24°E	5.3 M_{w}	VI	0	0	Minor damage, twin earthquakes (5.3 and 5.2)
M_{w} = moment magnitude scale and M_{s} = surface-wave magnitude. The inclusion criteria for adding events are based on WikiProject Earthquakes' notability guideline that was developed for stand alone articles. The principles described are also applicable to lists. In summary, only damaging, injurious, or deadly events should be recorded.

== See also ==
- Geology of Cyprus
- Geology of Northern Cyprus
