= Paphos Castle =

- (Greek: Κάστρο της Πάφου, Turkish: Baf Kalesi)
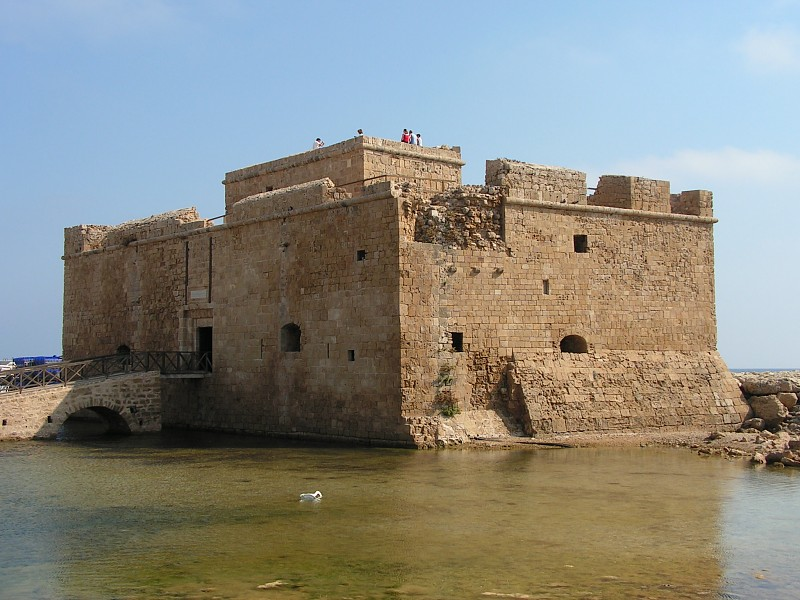

- Location within Cyprus

General information
- Architectural style: Medieval
- Location: Paphos, Cyprus
- Coordinates: 34.75367°N 32.406911°E

Paphos Castle is located at the western end of the port of Paphos and dates to the mid-13th century. The castle's original structure was built after the earthquake of 1222 destroyed Saranta Kolones, an earlier fortress about 600 metres (2,000 ft) north-east.

== History ==
After the nearby Saranta Kolones fortress was destroyed in the earthquake of 1222. Paphos Castle was built and expanded by the Lusignans in the 13th century. They also built the so-called Genoese Towers. It is a castle consisting of a complex of two towers, the ruins of which are 80 metres (260 ft) east of the castle, right at the entrance of the port and served as its best defense. Although these towers were considered subservient to the larger castle they had no contact with each other and were probably a separate castle. They got their name because of their importance in the battle against the Genoese in 1373, where they played an important role in the defense of the city port, as the Genoese were mainly a naval force. They were also important in the battle against the Mamluk Sultanate in 1426, where they suffered severe damage.

The Genoese occupied the castle in 1373. During their occupation, they raised the castle's walls and altered the moat. After making these fortifications, the Genoese were able to repel the Cypriots when the Cypriots attacked with siege towers. Genoese rule formally ended in October of 1374, when a treaty was signed in Nicosia returning Cyprus, with the exception of Famagusta, to the Cypriots. The castle was one of the few not covered by the Mamluks in 1426, under the guidance of its guardsman, Sforza, who was a fierce Spanish mercenary. The Venetians then occupied Paphos Castle after annexing Cyprus in 1489. The German traveller Dietrich von Schachten, who visited Cyprus in 1491, claimed that an earthquake earlier that year had destroyed the eastern tower of the castle. The western tower was then destroyed by the Venetians in 1570, just before the Ottomans invaded Cyprus, to prevent the Ottomans from making use of the castle. In 1592, the Ottomans reconstructed the western tower. This reconstruction is referenced in an inscription on a marble slab above the castle's entrance. During Ottoman-rule the castle had a guard of 100 men and 12 cannons which left with the arrival of the British in 1878.

== Architecture ==
The main part of the castle consists of a large rectangular tower (40 m × 20 m (131 ft × 66 ft)) with a closed courtyard in the middle. The ground floor consists of a central hall with small rooms and large rooms on each of its two sides, which were used as prisons and barracks during Ottoman-rule. On the roof there is a small square Tower (15 m × 10 m (49 ft × 33 ft)) with three large rooms, where the guard of the castle lived. At the same level around the perimeter there are 12 ramparts on the roof, which could hold a corresponding number of cannons during Ottoman-rule.

In 1878, with the arrival of the British, the castle ceased to be used for military purposes and became a salt depot. In 1935, the Department of Antiquities was founded and Paphos Castle was designated an ancient monument, putting it in the department's care. In 1938–1339 various cracks in the walls and breakwater were repaired. The castle was devastated by the earthquake of 1953 and repairs were completed in 1969. It was also hit by the Turkish air and naval forces on July 21, 1974, during the bombing of the port of Paphos, but suffered no serious damage. Most recently, the castle serves as the setting for the annual Paphos Outdoor Cultural Festival in September. Several archeological excavations have been carried out.

== Tourism ==
Currently, the castle is used as a tourist attraction and occasionally has thematic exhibitions.

== See also ==
- List of Crusader castles
