= Skala (neighborhood in Larnaca) =

- Location within Cyprus Location within the Eastern Mediterranean Location within the European Union Location within Asia
- Coordinates: 34°55′N 33°38′E
- Country: Cyprus
- District: Larnaca District
- Municipality: Larnaca

Population (2021)
  - Total: 6,599
- Time zone: UTC+2 (EET)
  - Summer (DST): UTC+3 (EEST)

Skala or Scala (Greek: Σκάλα, Turkish: Iskele) is neighbourhood or quarter of Larnaca, Cyprus and is also commonly used to refer to Larnaca itself.

== Name ==
The ancient city of Kition was a port, but when the modern town of Larnaca grew in its place, the site was about 1/2 mi (0.80 km) inland. A new settlement also began on the modern shoreline. This was called “Scala” from the French for landing stage - “place d'escale”. Escale derives from the Italian word Scala - a flight of stairs and by extension a landing stage for ships. The same word occurs in Greek and Latin.

== Geography ==
Skala is bordered on the north by the Chrysopolitissa quarter and extends southward to the Larnaca municipal boundary near the airport . Inland it is bordered by the St. Nicholas quarter. The Skala quarter thus encompasses Finikoudes, Larnaca Castle, the old Turkish quarter including the adjacent great mosque, and the Mackenzie Beach area. The urban shopping centre of Larnaca lies within the quarter. The quarter also has the highest proportion of foreign citizens (49% in 2011) and the highest proportion of economically active people of all the quarters of Larnaca.

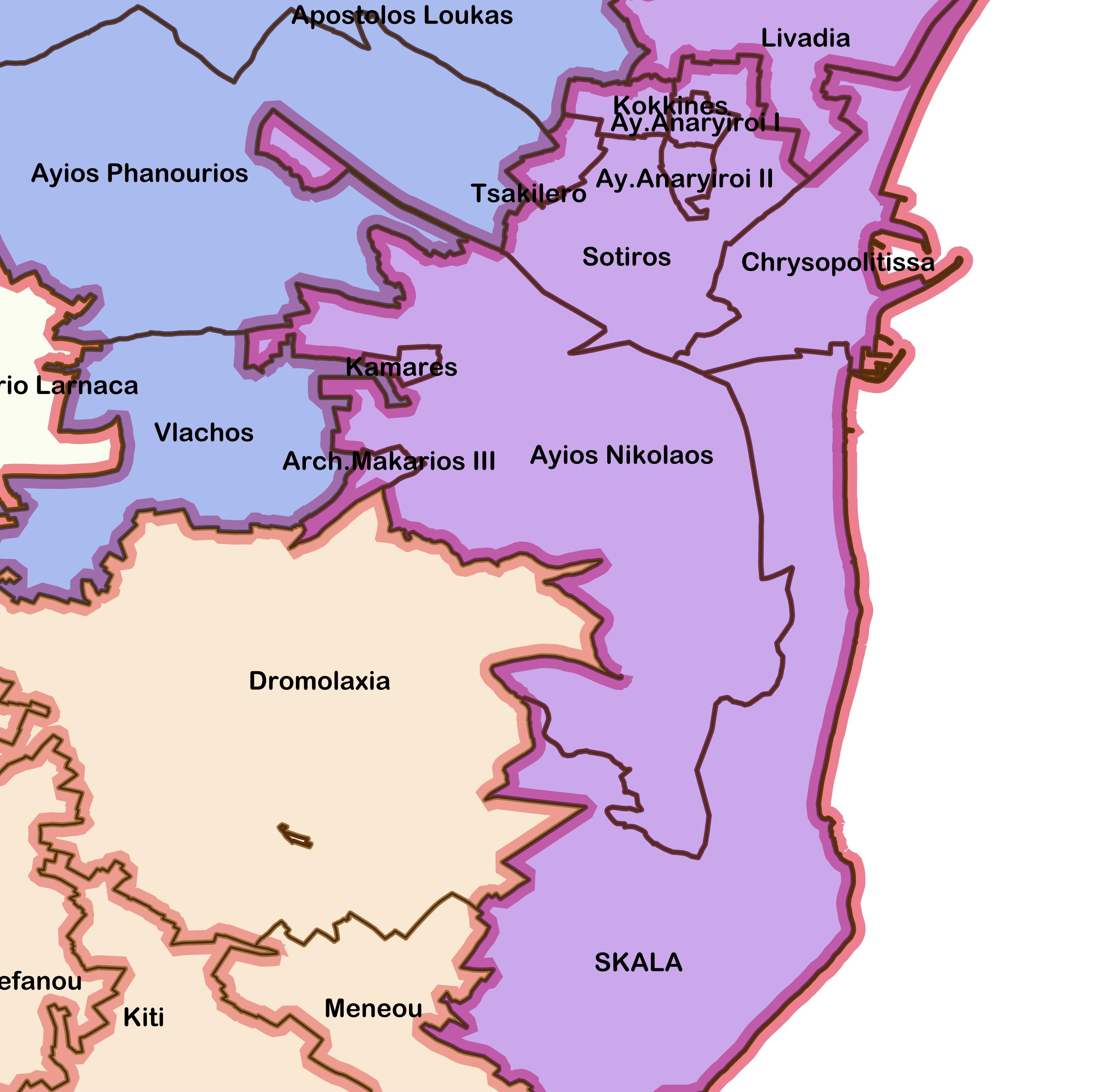
The quarters (neighbourhoods) of Larnaca showing Skala

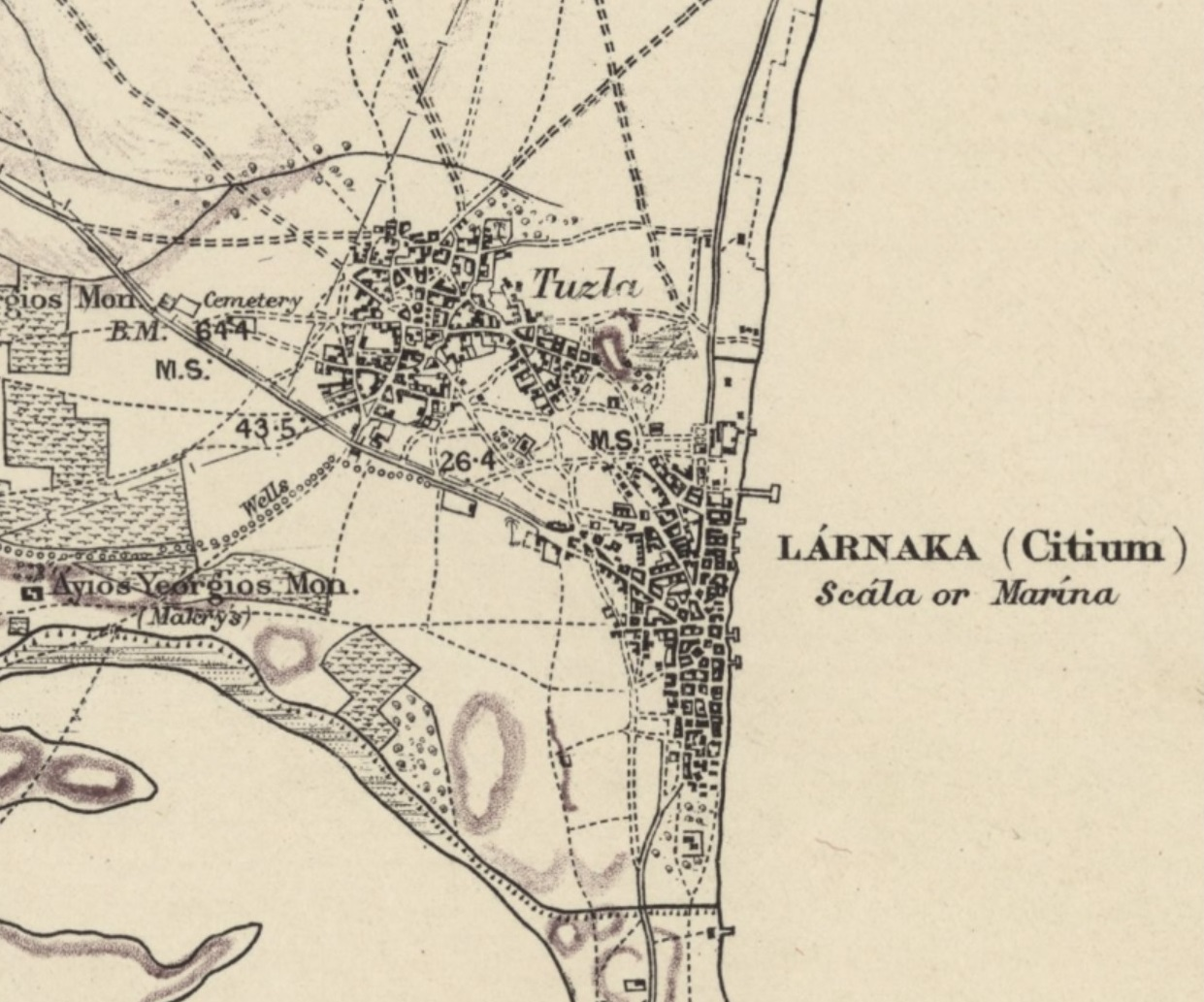
Skala 1882 (Kitchener's survey of Cyprus)

== History ==
In the middle ages Skala was called "Les Salines de Saint Ladre", which referred to the nearby salt lake and St. Lazarus, whose reputed burial place was under the church of that name. But Salines was destroyed by the Mamelukes in 1425. Both Skala and Larnaca were described as ruins in 1599.

Later in the Ottoman period, Larnaca began to grow over the remains of the ancient city of Kition, which was by then no longer on the sea and its harbour was silted up. However, Skala also began to grow by the sea by the landing area for ships in the roadstead. The Ottoman population census of 1831 recorded a male population of 914 for the town of Skala (37% moslem). For comparison the town of Larnaca had 1,223 - (22% moslem), then consisting of the quarters of Tuzla Centre, Chryspolitissa, St. John and Sotiros. In the Ottoman period the two settlements of Larnaca and Skala were quite distinct, however after the cession of Cyprus to Great Britain (1878) there was an increase in population and the gap between the two was gradually filled with modern buildings.

In the 1881 census, the details of Skala and Tuzla (old Larnaca) are recorded separately. Skala had a population of 4,739, while Tuzla had 3094. By 1946, Skala had a population of 7,668 of which 5,050 were Greek Cypriot, 1,988 were Turkish Cypriot and 630 others. Old Larnaca had a population of 7,104 of which 5,555 were Greek Cypriot, 940 were Turkish Cypriot and 609 others. Following intercommunal strife in 1963-64, many Turkish Cypriots in the surrounding area sought refuge in the Turkish Cypriot part of Skala (south of Larnaca Castle, at Lala Moustafa Pasha Street.), as well as in the Turkish Cypriot enclave of Tuzla. During the Turkish invasion of 1974, fierce fighting erupted in Larnaca and the population of the Turkish Cypriot enclaves was eventually resettled in the Turkish occupied areas, especially around Trikomo, which was renamed Iskele, Skala in Turkish.

An article in the Dom Research Center-KURI Journal said that "Orthodox Christian Gypsies were also forcibly moved by the Turkish-Cypriot government from the area around Iskele to form a new community in Yeni Iskele or Skala".

== Quarter ==
As a quarter (Enoria in Greek) of the town of Larnaca, Skala has its own Koinotarch (Community head). The population in 2021 was 6,599.

The area of the quarter is 1,186 hectares (about 4.6 sq.miles)
