= Latakia Ridge =

Plate boundary zone between the African Plate and the Anatolian Plate

The Latakia Ridge is a major underwater formation extending over 200 km along the northern margin of the Levantine Basin, marking the plate boundary between the African Plate and the Anatolian Plate. Rising up to 500 metres above the surrounding seafloor, it forms the easternmost segment of the Cyprus Arc, connecting the Hecataeus Rise south of Cyprus with a series of ridges off the Syrian coast. The ridge first developed in the mid-Late Cretaceous as a compressional fold-thrust belt, and was later reworked by left-lateral strike-slip motion from the Pliocene to the present. Exploration has revealed significant hydrocarbon potential in the region, with seismic images suggesting large gas accumulations trapped beneath the thrust faults.

== Geology and tectonic evolution ==
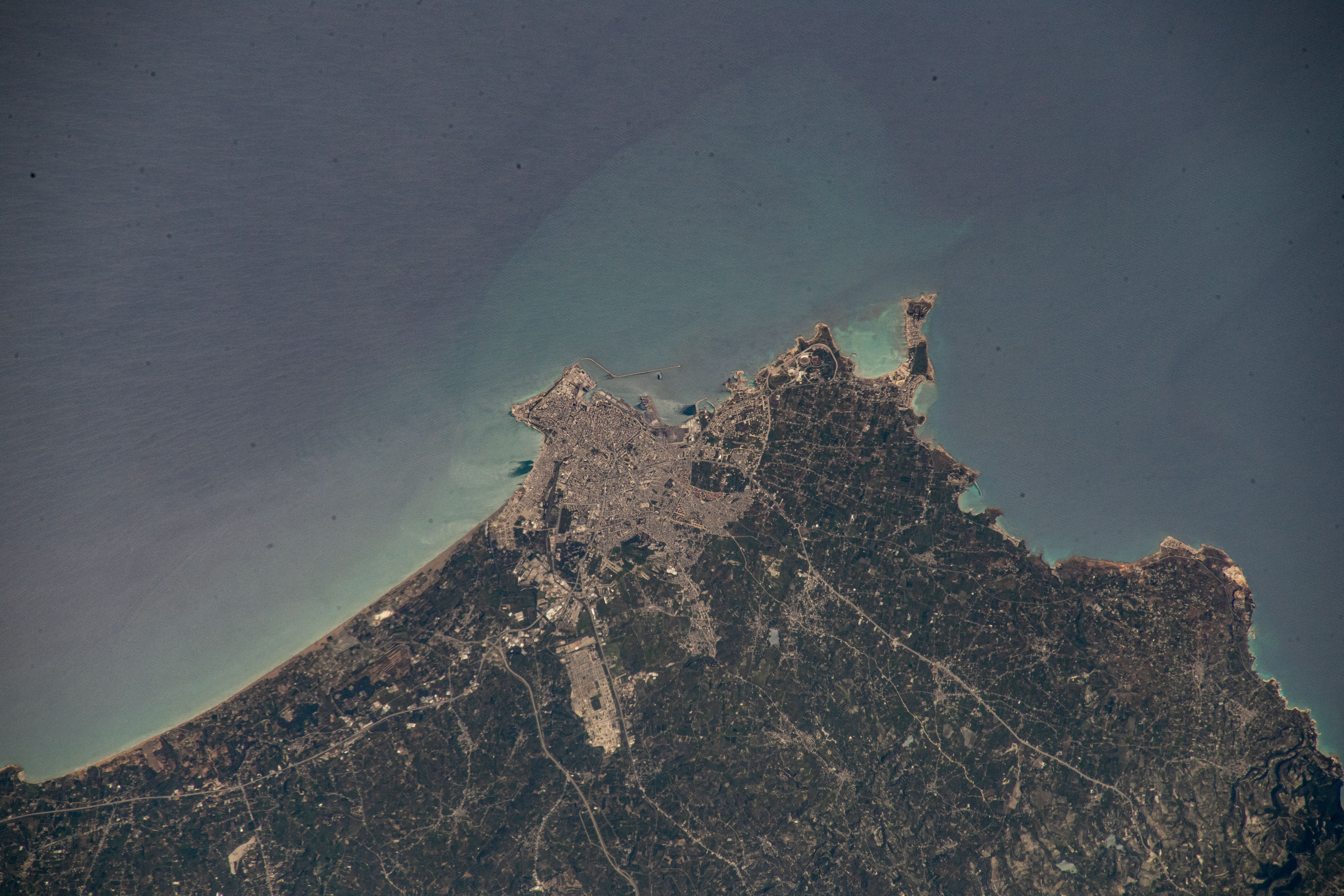
Port of Latakia viewed from the International Space Station in 2023

The Latakia Ridge is a prominent northeast–trending bathymetric high on the northern margin of the Levantine Basin. It forms the easternmost segment of the Cyprus Arc, linking the steep Hecataeus Rise south of Cyprus with a series of ridges off the Syrian coast. Rising up to 500 m above the surrounding seafloor and extending over 200 km, the ridge delineates the present-day boundary between the African and Anatolian Plates. This structural high first developed in the mid–Late Cretaceous as a compressional fold–thrust belt during NW–SE convergence of the African and Eurasian plates, punctuated by emplacement of ophiolitic nappes and the formation of a Late Cretaceous regional unconformity.

High-resolution seismic reflection data reveal that the ridge's basement comprises deep-marine sediments deposited from the Eocene through the lower Miocene. During the Miocene (about 23–5 million years ago, Ma), these strata were gently folded into long, asymmetric anticlines—upward-arching folds—and emplaced by southeast-directed thrust faults, forming a classic fold-thrust belt. This phase ended with regional uplift and erosion prior to the deposition of evaporites from the Messinian age. The weight of folding and ophiolite loading flexed the lithosphere north of the ridge, creating a foreland basin that was filled by Late Cretaceous to Eocene deep-water marls and shales, whose onlapping reflections mark key seismic horizons.

From the Pliocene (about 5 Ma) to the present, the ridge was reworked by oblique, sinistral (left-lateral) strike–slip motion. Reactivation of the earlier thrusts, together with new back-thrusts dipping in the opposite direction, produced a narrow pop-up geometry known as a positive flower structure. This transpressional regime is recorded by onlapping and thinning of overlying Plio-Quaternary sediment layers on both flanks of the ridge, marking simultaneous uplift and deposition during active faulting.

== Hydrocarbon prospectivity ==
The Latakia Ridge region shows clear evidence of both biogenic and thermogenic hydrocarbons. Four exploration wells drilled within 5 km of the shoreline (Fidio-1, Latakia-1, Latakia-2 and Latakia-3) encountered gas shows in Lower Cretaceous and Tertiary carbonates, as well as oil or asphalt in fractured Cretaceous strata, confirming active maturation and migration of hydrocarbons into multiple levels of the section. Seismic images show column-shaped gas emissions cutting through the thick Messinian salt layers and flat, horizontal reflections—"flat-spots"—within arch-shaped folds. These features suggest very large gas accumulations, potentially several trillion cubic feet, trapped beneath the thrust faults.

Satellite synthetic-aperture radar surveys further reinforce this working petroleum system by mapping repeating oil slicks along major faults that cut through the ridge, demonstrating active seepage pathways from subsurface reservoirs to the sea surface. Proven reservoir analogues include Lower Miocene deep-water turbidite sands—similar to those exploited in the nearby Tamar and Leviathan fields—while Early–Middle Miocene carbonates (equivalent to the Horu Formation) and Pliocene–Quaternary sand-rich channel-levee deposits offer additional targets of varying depth and depositional style.

There are several ways that rocks around the Latakia Ridge can trap oil and gas. First, large arch-shaped folds form where deep thrust faults push rock layers upward, and more complex pop-up and flower-shaped structures develop when sideways (left-lateral) compression reactivates those faults. In the northwestern area, tall columns of salt (diapirs) pierce the overlying sediments and bend them into closures on either flank; these zones often host clustered seismic anomalies—flat-spots and bright-spots—that point to fluid accumulation. Finally, changes in sediment layer thickness create stratigraphic traps where porous turbidite sands thin out against the base of the nearby ophiolite high or against drowned carbonate build-ups formed during repeated cycles of sea-level rise and fall.
