= 1222 Cyprus earthquake =

Strong seismic event

- Location within Cyprus
- Local date: 11 May 1222
- Local time: 08:15
- Magnitude: 7.0–7.5
- Epicenter: 34.7°N 32.6°E
- Areas affected: Cyprus
- Max. intensity: MMI IX (Violent)
- Tsunami: Yes
- Casualties: Many

The 1222 Cyprus earthquake occurred at about 06:15 UTC on 11 May. It had an estimated magnitude of 7.0–7.5 and triggered a paleotsunami that was recorded in Libya and Alexandria. The strongest shaking was felt in Nicosia, Limassol and Paphos. Many people died, although there are no estimates for the total number of casualties.

== Tectonic setting ==
The estimated location of the earthquake is on the southwestern coast of Cyprus and is thought to be associated with the Cyprus Arc. The Cyprus Arc is part of the plate boundary zone that accommodates the motion of the African plate relative to the Anatolian plate. The relative motion of the Anatolian plate is almost entirely westwards relative to the African plate. In the eastern part of the arc, earthquakes are entirely strike-slip in character. To the west they show a combination of thrust faulting and strike-slip. A major NE-SW trending strike-slip structure has been identified just west of Cyprus, that is responsible for larger earthquakes in the area.

== Damage ==
Much damage was caused at Limassol and Nicosia and other parts of the island, but the greatest damage was done at Paphos, where there were many deaths. Paphos Castle, a Byzantine fort, was destroyed and had to be rebuilt by the Lusignans. A modern excavation at Paphos Castle found the remains of a man who apparently climbed into the castle's main drain to escape the earthquake but was trapped there by falling masonry. The sea retreated from the harbour but returned and flooded the town. A church is said to have fallen, burying the bishop and his congregation. Monks of the Franciscan order abandoned their church in Paphos after the earthquake. The castle of Saranta Kolones, built only 30 years earlier overlooking the harbour, was destroyed by the earthquake. It was never rebuilt, as it was no longer needed to protect the port, which had dried up. The earthquake permanently changed Paphos, rendering the harbour unusable, and moving the shoreline seawards; it no longer had a protected anchorage.

== Characteristics ==
The estimated magnitude for this event is 7.0–7.5 with a maximum estimated felt intensity of IX (Violent).

== See also ==
- List of earthquakes in Cyprus
- List of historical earthquakes
- List of tsunamis
