= Hellenic subduction zone =

Convergent boundary between the African and Aegean Sea plates

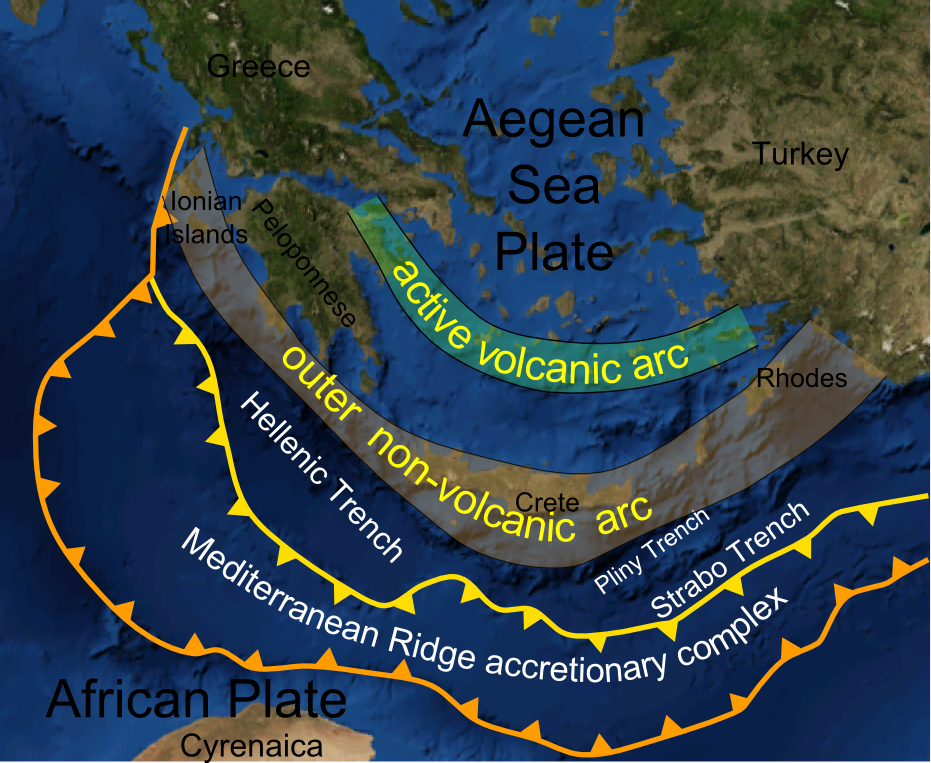
Location of the Hellenic Subduction Zone and its surface features

The Hellenic subduction zone (HSZ) is the convergent boundary between the African plate and the Aegean Sea plate, where oceanic crust of the African continent is being subducted north–northeastwards beneath the Aegean. The southernmost and shallowest part of the zone is obscured beneath the deformed thick sedimentary sequence that forms the Mediterranean Ridge accretionary complex. It has a well-defined Wadati–Benioff zone of seismicity, which demonstrates the relatively shallow dip of its southern part, which increases markedly to the north of the non-volcanic part of the Hellenic arc. The descending slab has been imaged using seismic tomography down to the top of the mantle transition zone at 410 km depth.

== Surface expression ==
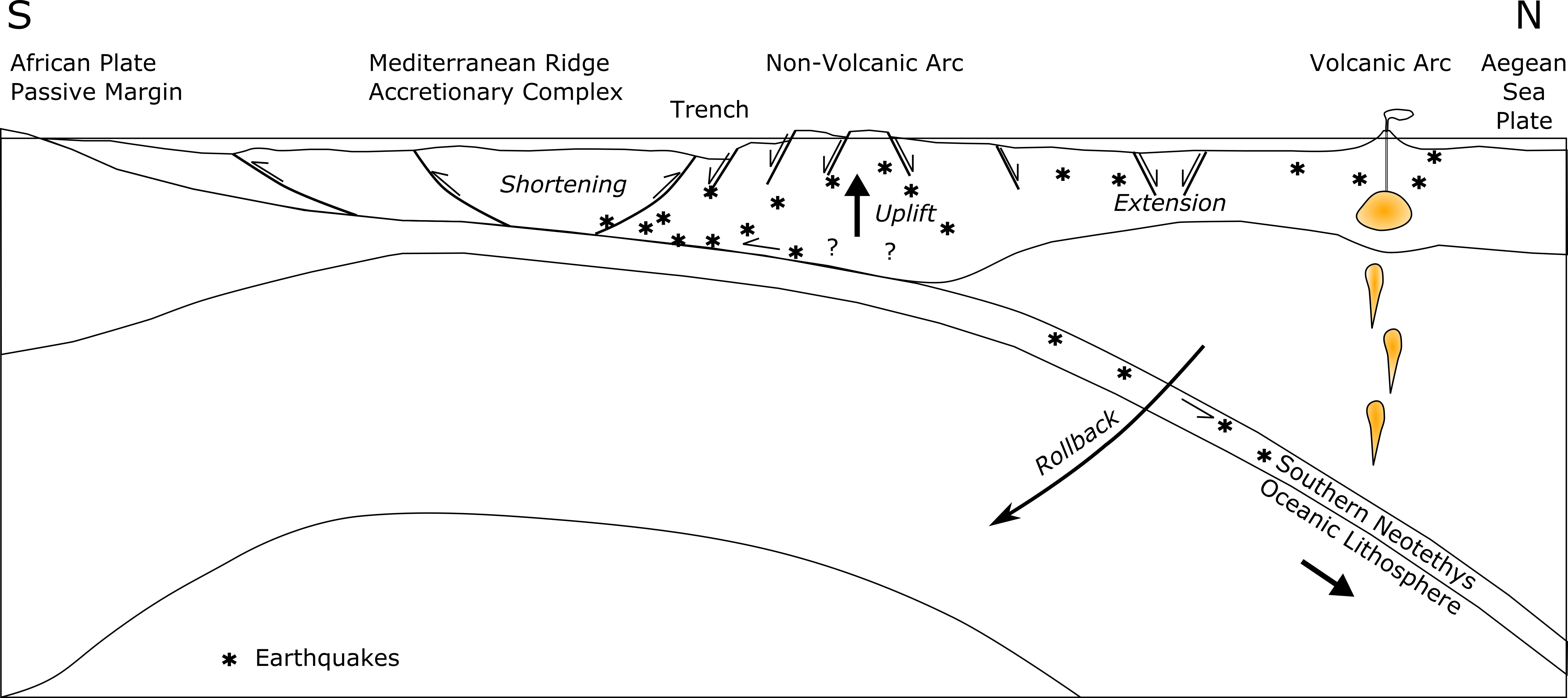
Schematic cross-section over the Hellenic subduction zone

When the subduction zone was originally identified in the 1970s, it was thought that the Hellenic trench was the surface expression of the HSZ. Once the Mediterranean Ridge was recognised as an accretionary complex, the majority of geoscientists regarded the Hellenic trenches as features within the forearc region of the Hellenic arc, created by some combination of extension, strike-slip or thrusting within the crust of the Aegean Sea plate. Some geoscientists continue to refer to the Hellenic trench as the surface expression of the subduction zone.

The 2,000 km long Mediterranean Ridge is the fastest growing accretionary complex in the world. The size of the complex is a result of a combination of fast rate of convergence combined with the unusually thick sequence of sediments deposited on the Neotethyan oceanic crust, which is thought to be of Jurassic age. The northern edge of the ridge is generally interpreted as a northward-moving backthrust. The degree to which the observed thrust faults within the ridge connect directly with the subduction interface remains unclear, due to poor seismic imaging caused by the presence of a thick layer of Messinian salt.

== Slab geometry ==
Tomographic data indicate that there is no link between the descending HSZ slab and those associated with either the Calabrian arc to the west or the Cyprus arc to the east. However, a study of earthquake hypocentres suggests that the shallower part of the zone is continuous with the subduction zone west of Cyprus, with a developing slab tear further to the north in its deeper parts. The HSZ slab is divided into two main segments, the western and eastern, with the division between them running roughly north–south through central Crete. The Wadati–Benioff zone for the western segment dips at about 30° over a depth range of 20–100 km and 45° from 100 to 150 km. The boundary between the two is interpreted to be a slab tear.

== Magmatism ==
The subduction of the African plate slab has led to the development of a volcanic arc, known as the South Aegean Volcanic Arc (SAVA). Magmatism began in the early Pliocene, with typical arc-related andesite–dacite volcanism, stretching from the Saronic Gulf in the west to Santorini in the east. In the mid to late Quaternary, the area of active volcanism spread into the eastern part of the SAVA, with a more varied chemistry, including tholeiitic and calk-alkaline basalts, large amounts of dacite with some rhyolite. This change in chemistry is thought to represent the effects of regional extension.

== Development ==
There is evidence that more than 1500 km of Neotethyan oceanic crust has been subducted along this structure or earlier versions of it. Broadly northward subduction of Neotethys beneath Eurasia was already established in the Late Cretaceous. This proceeded by the progressive closing up of different parts of Neotethys with the accretion of intervening continental areas to Eurasia. This involves backstepping of the subduction zone southwards across each microcontinent, so maintaining a continuous slab, as suggested by the tomographic results.

The onset of subduction of southern Neotethys was diachronous, starting in the east in the latest Eocene (ca. 35 Ma), beneath Crete in the early Miocene and in the Pliocene (ca. 4 Ma) at the western end of the HSZ beneath the Ionian Islands. The initially near planar slab began to fold in the latest Oligocene (25–23 Ma), associated with differential slab rollback and trench retreat, causing major clockwise rotation of western Greece. From mid-Miocene times (ca. 15 Ma) the slab curvature became more pronounced and southwestern Turkey began to rotate anticlockwise. During the period a major tear developed between the main part of the HSZ and the Western Cyprus zone, forming a slab window in the deeper part of the slab.

Currently, the rate of movement along the HSZ is estimated to be about 35 mm per year. However, the overall convergence between the African and Eurasian plates is only about 5 mm per year. This discrepancy is consistent with continuing slab rollback and relatively fast southward movement of the Aegean Sea plate, accompanied by ongoing extension within that plate.
