= South Aegean Volcanic Arc =

Chain of volcanic islands in the South Aegean Sea

Coordinates: 36°25′00″N 25°26′00″E

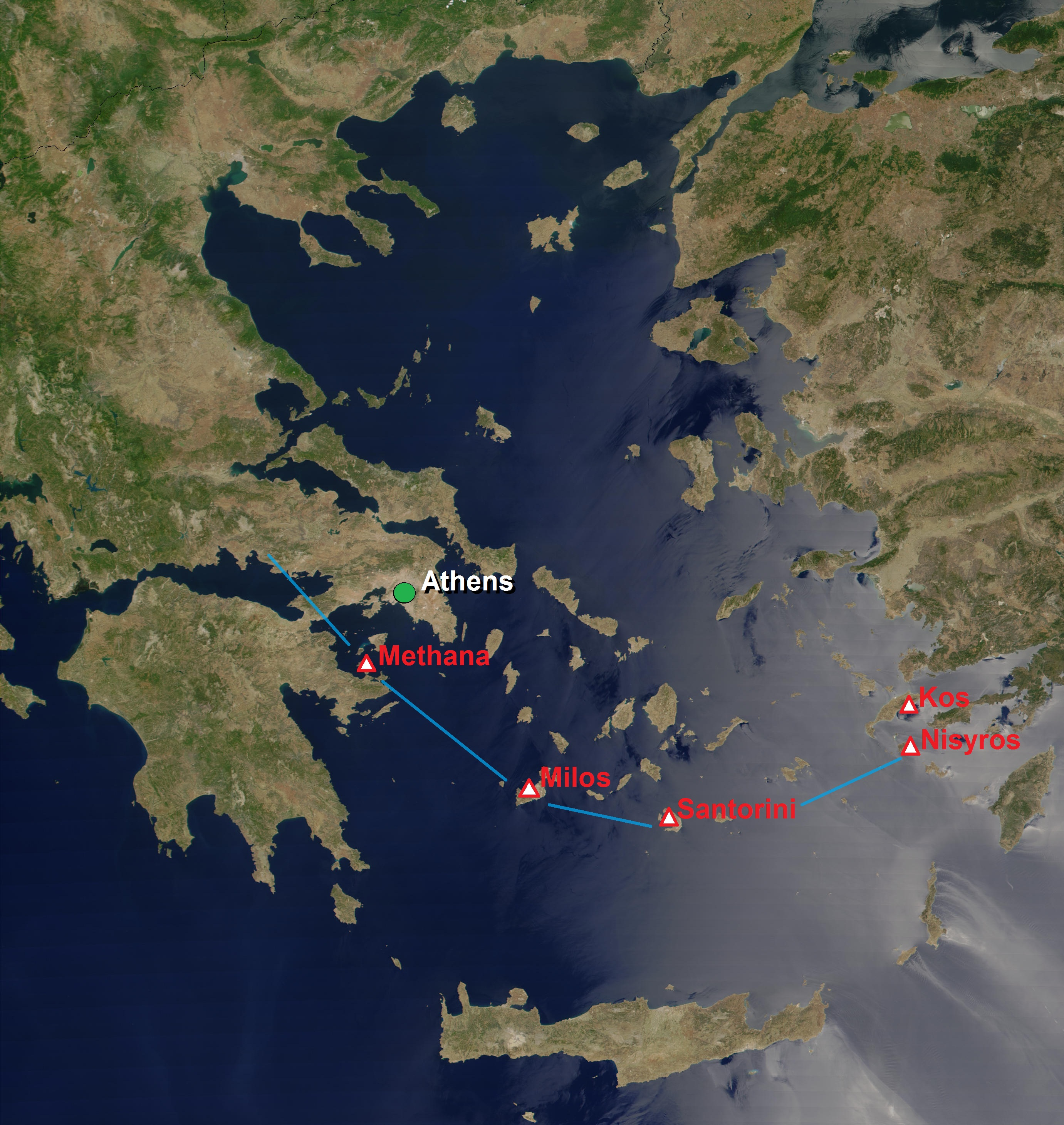
- The arc is shown by the blue line. Along it are dozens of volcanic hot spots. A few are denoted in red.

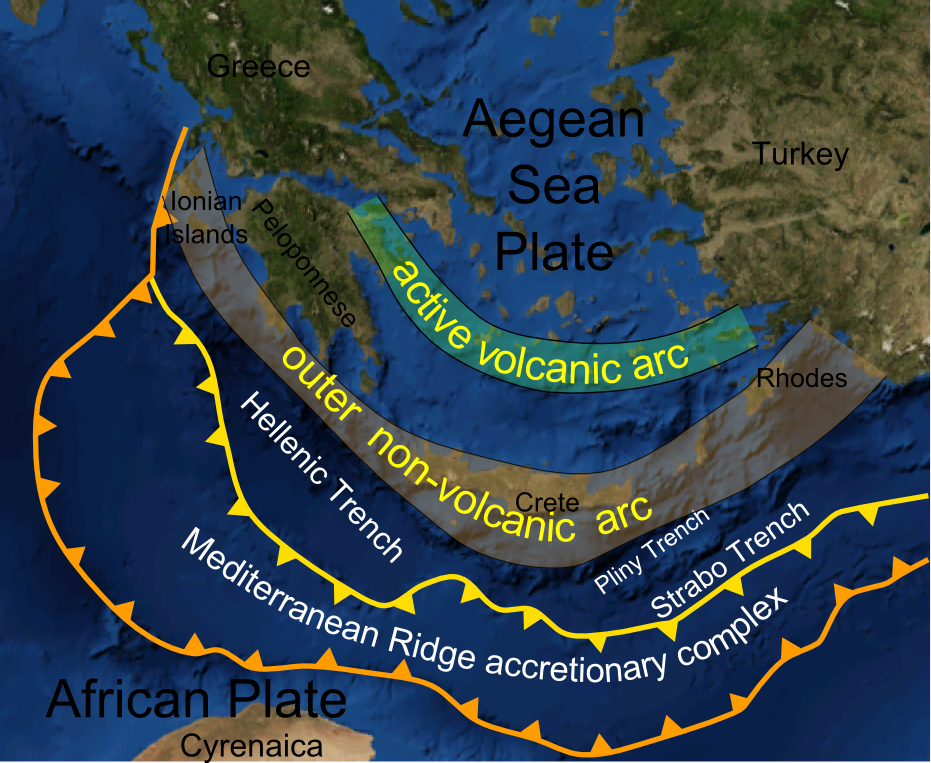
- The volcanic arc is shown to the north of and parallel to the forearc, which runs through Crete.
- Country: Greece, Turkey
- Region: South Aegean Sea
- Coordinates: Those of Santorini, located at about the center of the arc.

The South Aegean Volcanic Arc is a volcanic arc in the South Aegean Sea formed by plate tectonics. The prior cause was the subduction of the African plate beneath the Eurasian plate, raising the Aegean arc across what is now the North Aegean Sea. In the Holocene, the process of back-arc extension began, probably stimulated by pressure from the Arabian plate compressing the region behind the arc. The extension deformed the region into its current configuration. First, the arc moved to the south and assumed its arcuate configuration. Second, the Aegean Sea opened behind the arc because the crust was thinned and weakened there. Third, magma broke through the thinned crust to form a second arc composed of a volcanic chain. And finally, the Aegean Sea plate broke away from Eurasia in the new fault zone to the north.

The extension is still ongoing. The current southern Aegean is one of the most rapidly deforming regions of the Himalayan-Alpine mountain belt. It is approximately 450 km long and 20 km to 40 km wide and runs from the Isthmus of Corinth on the Greek mainland to the Bodrum peninsula on the Turkish mainland.

== Volcanoes of the arc ==
The active portion of the South Aegean Volcanic Arc comprises a number of dormant and historically active volcanoes, including Sousaki, Aegina, Methana, Milos, Santorini and Kolumbo, Kos, Nisyros and Yali, and Akyarlar. Of these, only Santorini, Kolumbo, and Nisyros have either erupted or shown any significant evidence of unrest during the past 100 years.

One of the most noted volcanic eruptions from this arc occurred on the island of Santorini in the 2nd millennium BC; during the catastrophic volcanic eruption of Santorini, the Bronze Age city of Akrotiri was destroyed, with archaeological remains becoming well preserved under the volcanic ash.

== See also ==
- Hellenic arc
- Hellenic subduction zone
- Minoan eruption
- Santorini

== General and cited references ==
- Mountrakis, D. (2005). "Tertiary and Quaternary tectonics in Aegean area". In G. E. Vougioukalakis; M. Fytikas (eds.). The South Aegean Active Volcanic Arc: Present Knowledge and Future Perspectives. Developments in Volcanology 7. Burlington, Vt.: Elsevier Science. ISBN 9780080457574. OCLC 469386658.
