= Trikomo, Cyprus =

Trikomo: Τρίκωμο (Greek); İskele (Turkish)
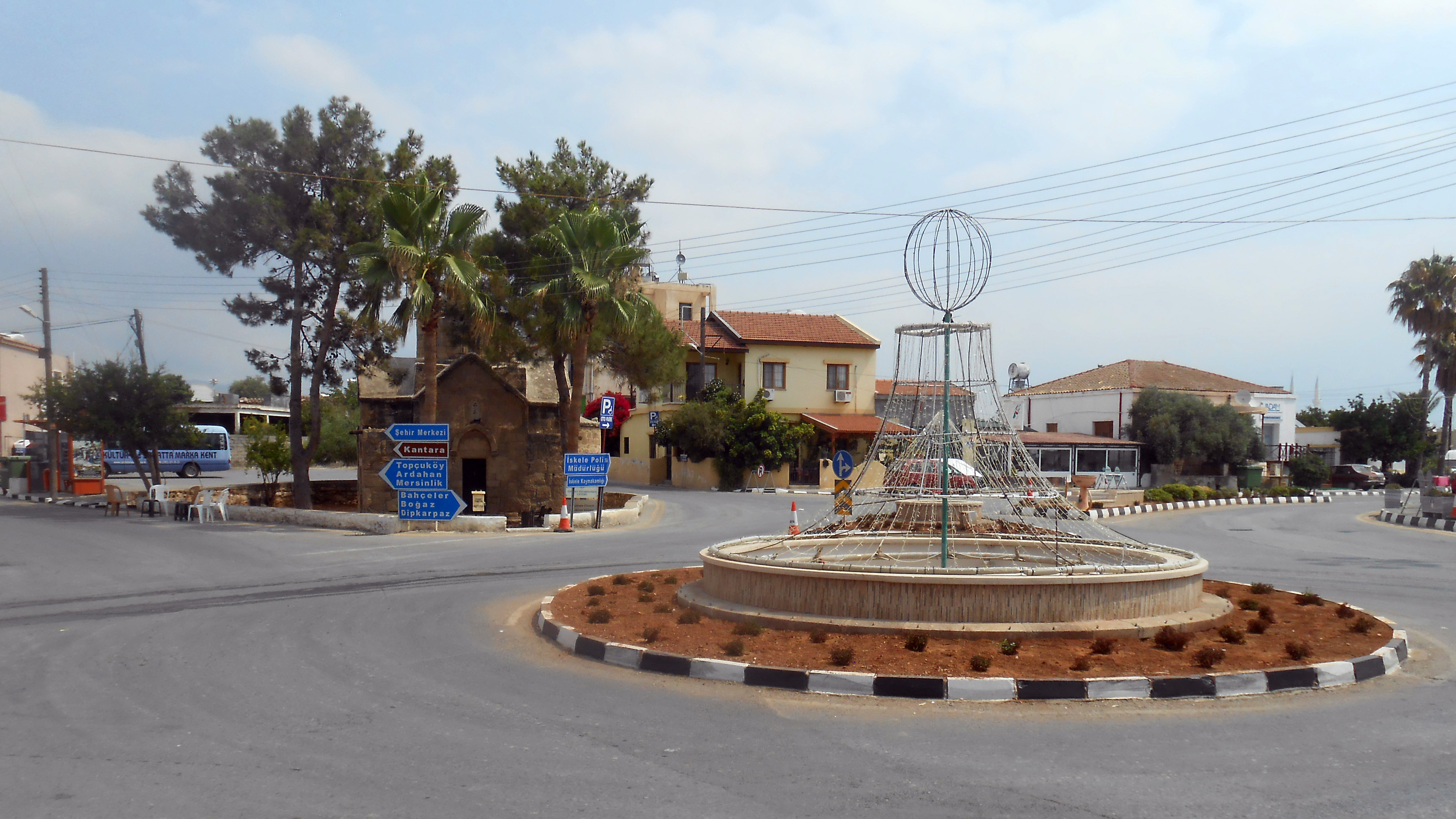
- The main square in Trikomo

- Location in Cyprus
- Coordinates: 35°17′15″N 33°53′30″E
- Country (de jure): Cyprus
  - District: Famagusta District
- Country (de facto): Northern Cyprus
  - District: İskele District

Government
  - Mayor: Hasan Sadıkoğlu (UBP)

Population (2011)
  - Total: 1,948
  - Municipality: 7,906
- Time zone: UTC+2 (EET)
  - Summer (DST): UTC+3 (EEST)
- Climate: Csa
- Website: İskele Municipality

Yeni İskele (or Trikomo; Greek: Τρίκωμο; Turkish: İskele) is a town in North-Eastern Mesaoria in Cyprus. It is under the de facto control of Northern Cyprus and is the administrative center of the İskele District of Northern Cyprus. It gained municipality status in 1998.

== History ==
Prior to the Turkish invasion of Cyprus of 1974, the population of Trikomo consisted almost entirely of Greek Cypriots, most of whom were illegally evicted from their properties during the Turkish invasion on the island in summer 1974. The Greek Cypriots who were evicted are now considered as "refugees" and been displaced to the south of the island. Similarly, in 1974, Turkish Cypriots from the Skala neighbourhood of Larnaca ("İskele" in Turkish) settled in the village, giving it the Turkish translation of the name of the location they were living in before 1974 (lit. "New İskele", later shortened to İskele).

Turkish Cypriot Larnaca Municipality that was founded in 1958 moved to Trikomo in 1974.

== Culture, sports, and tourism ==
Turkish Cypriot Larnaka Gençler Birliği or İskele Gençlerbirliği Sports Club was founded in 1934 in Larnaca, and as of the 2018–19 season plays in the KTFF Süper Lig.

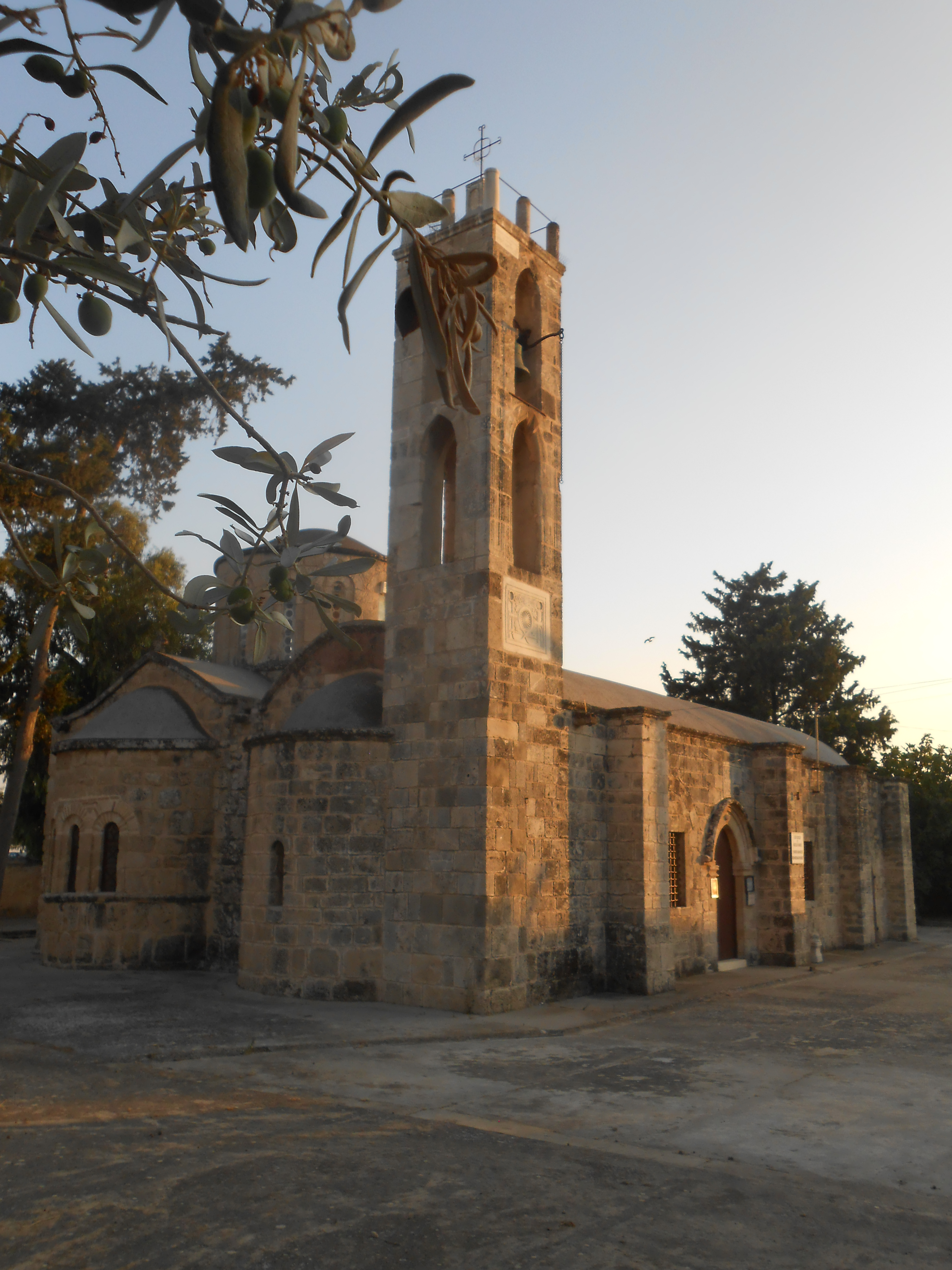
Greek Orthodox church in İskele (Trikomo)

Trikomo contains the Panagia Theotokos Church, which hosts an icon museum showcasing rare examples of medieval iconography in Cyprus. The church is a twin church consisting of Orthodox and Catholic sections. Its older Orthodox section dates to the Byzantine era while the Catholic section was built in the 12th century during the Lusignan period.

The town also annually hosts the İskele Festival, which takes place for ten days in the summer, and is the oldest annual festival in Cyprus, first held in Larnaca in 1968. In 1974, the festival was moved to Trikomo along with the move of the Turkish Cypriot inhabitants. It features an international folk dance festival, concerts by Turkish Cypriot and mainland Turkish musicians, various sports tournaments, food stalls and competitions, as well as other shows and contests highlighting the cultural heritage of the town.

== Politics ==
The current mayor of the town is Hasan Sadıkoğlu. Sadıkoğlu was elected in 2014 as an independent candidate. He was elected once more in 2018 as the candidate of the right-wing National Unity Party (UBP), winning with 54.6% of the votes. In the local elections of 2018, four members of the UBP, two members of the pro-settler Rebirth Party (YDP) and two members of the left-wing Republican Turkish Party (CTP) were elected to the eight-member municipal council.

== International relations ==
=== Twin towns – sister cities ===
Trikomo is twinned with:

- Beykoz, Istanbul, Turkey
- Büyükçekmece, Istanbul, Turkey
- Finike, Antalya, Turkey (since 2015)
- Mamak, Ankara, Turkey
- Pendik, Istanbul, Turkey
- Samsun, Turkey (since 2006)

== Notable people ==
- Vassos Karagiorgis (born 1929), archaeologist.
- Georgios Grivas (1898–1974), general in the Greek Army, leader of the EOKA guerrilla organisation and EOKA B paramilitary organisation.
