= Sousaki volcano =

Dormant volcano and solfatara field in Greece

Coordinates: 37.9368°N 23.0872°E

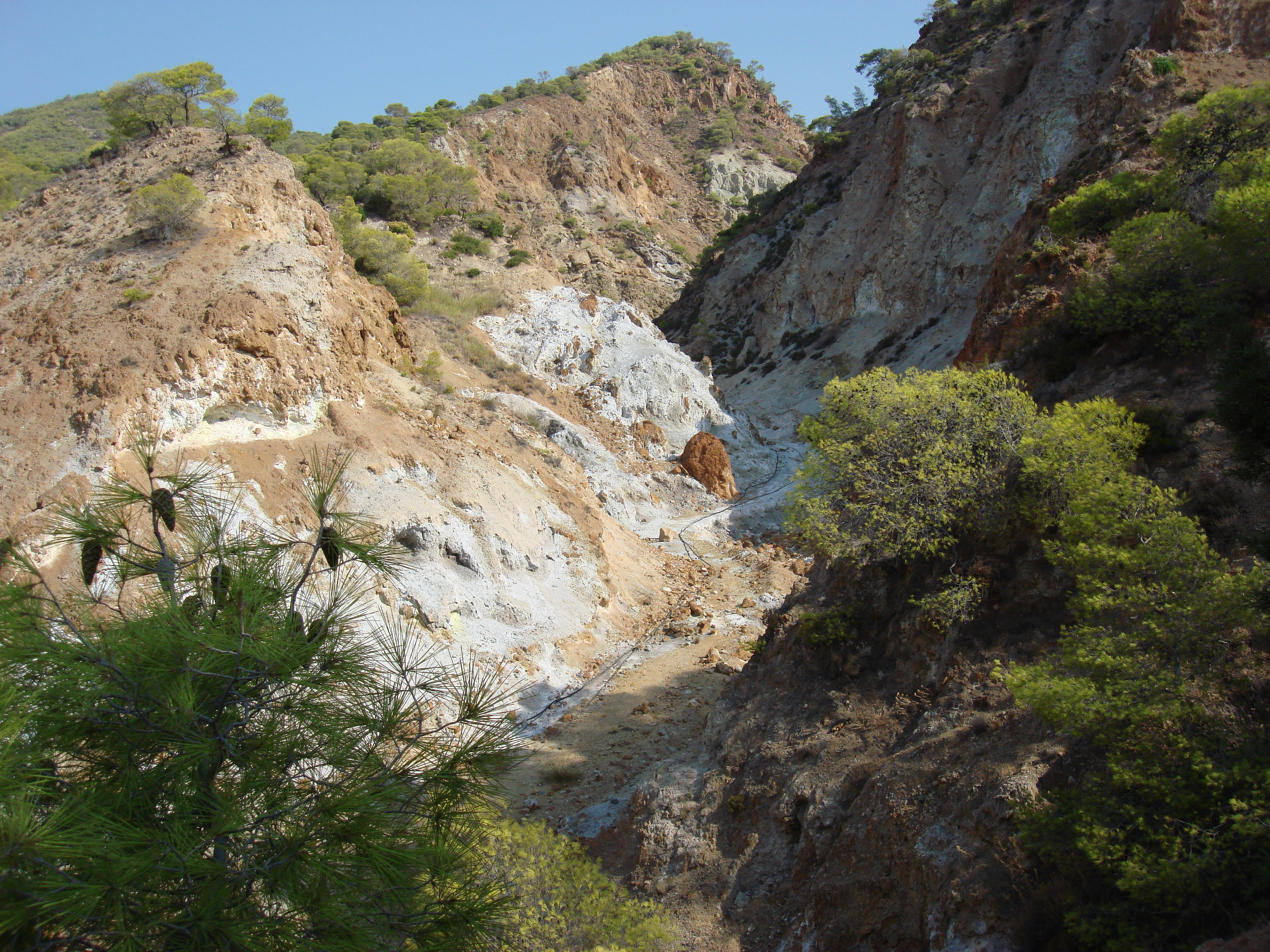
Thiochoma canyon, Sousaki

Sousaki (Greek: Σουσάκι; Modern Greek pronunciation: [suˈsaci]) is a dormant volcano and modern solfatara field in northeastern Corinthia, Greece, at the northwest end of the South Aegean Volcanic Arc.

The volcano was active during the Pliocene and early Quaternary periods of the Earth's geological history. There is still significant solfataric activity at this location. The volcano erupted dacite lava. The geothermal system releases about 1 megagram per day of gases at 42 °C, 90% CO_{2} and < 1% each of CH_{4} and H_{2}S. The earthquakes of 1997 of 3-4 R had as a result the uprising magma in higher areas of the earth crust. So future activities are possible.

The last eruption of this volcano was a side eruption which created new land in the Gulf of Megara, where there are major port and refinery facilities.
