= Troodos Ophiolite =

Late Cretaceous mid-ocean ridge that has been uplifted

The Troodos Ophiolite on the island of Cyprus represents a Late Cretaceous spreading axis (mid-ocean ridge) that has since been uplifted due to its positioning on the overriding Anatolian Plate at the Cyprus arc and ongoing subduction to the south of the Eratosthenes Seamount.

== Stratigraphy ==
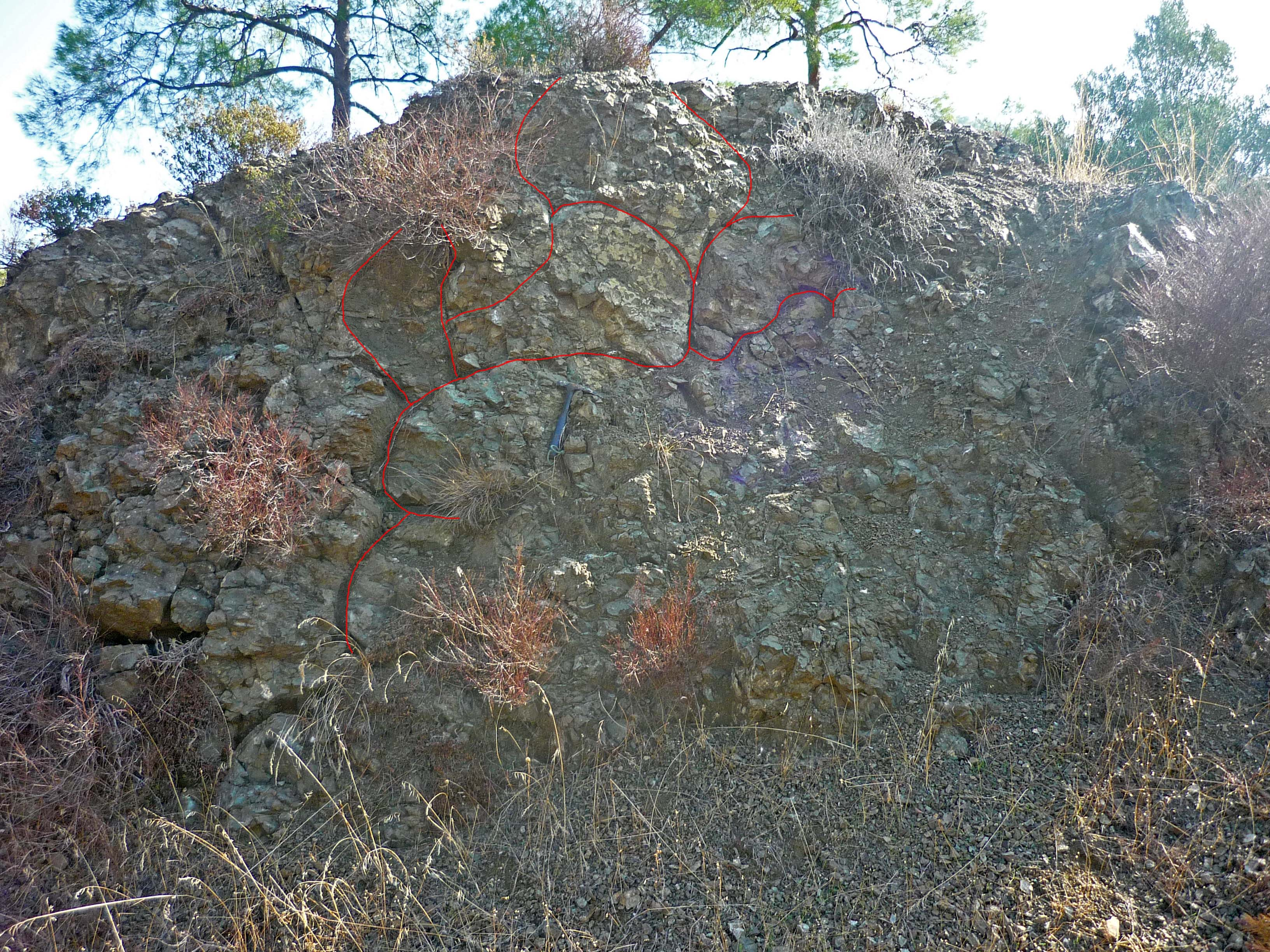
Pillow lava of the Troodos ophiolite (The red lines have been added to the photo by the photographer to outline the shape of some of the lava pillows)

Osozawa et al notes, "Similar to earlier studies, we find that island-arc tholeiite of the lower pillow lava sequence erupted first, followed by boninite. We further divide boninitic rocks into boninite making up the upper pillow lava sequence, and depleted boninites that we consider late infill lavas. We obtained an Ar-Ar age from arc tholeiite of 90.6 ± 1.2 Ma, comparable to U-Pb ages from ophiolite plagiogranites. New biostratigraphic data indicate that most of the basal pelagic sedimentary rocks that conformably overlie the boninitic rocks are ca. 75 Ma."

To the south there is the Mathiati-Margi massive sulfide ore body and stockwork mineralisation. The sulfide ore occurs at the same stratigraphic level as the Lower and Upper pillow lava contact, and is overlain by unmineralised lavas.

== Petrology ==
Sheeted dyke complex of the Troodos ophiolite

According to Moores and Vine, "The Troodos Massif, Cyprus, consists of a pseudostratiform mass of harzburgite, dunite, pyroxenite, gabbro, quartz diorite, diabase and pillow lava arranged in a dome-like manner. The diabase forms a remarkable dyke swarm, trending mostly north-south in which 100 km of extension is indicated over 100 km of exposure. Such a feature suggests formation by sea-floor spreading. The harzburgite and dunite are tectonites and probably represent uppermost mantle." Greenbaum notes the ophiolite complex contains podiform chrome deposits.

Alteration of the lavas is related to both axial hydrothermal systems and crustal aging in a submarine environment.

The presence of alteration in all of the extrusive levels but the very highest imply a succession of numerous hydrothermal convection cells active during eruption.

== Reconstruction of a spreading-axis ==
In terms of the physical mechanism of spreading the Troodos spreading axis is broadly comparable to that of a modern intermediate spreading ridge. The eruption rates along the ridge are high so there is little time for sediment accumulation during active periods. In terms of lava geochemistry and stratigraphy, however, Troodos is more likely to have formed in a subduction initiation setting

== Magmatic evolution ==
In 1973, Akiho Miyashiro challenged the common conception of Troodos Ophiolite and proposed an island arc origin for it. This was done arguing that numerous lavas and dykes in the ophiolite had calc-alkaline chemistries. In terms of ophiolite emplacement, there was a problem of how to uplift dense oceanic lithosphere through 5–6 km of water and onto continents.

In the supra-subduction zone, spreading is not controlled like in mid-ocean ridge settings, as the extension is mainly facilitated by slab rollback that creates space independently of the availability of magma. Therefore, the fastest spreading rates are caused by the most rapid rollback and thus favours a magmatic spreading as in many cases the mantle may not be able to keep up with the spreading. Therefore, there is unusually thinned crust, large low-angle extensional faults are common and much crustal rotation.

In 2025, Lehmann et al wrote, " We suggest that the Troodos Ophiolite formed at a laterally propagating trench-ridge ‘double junction’ during subduction initiation."

== See also ==
- Geology of Cyprus
