= Avdimou =

Avdimou Αυδήμου Evdim / Düzkaya
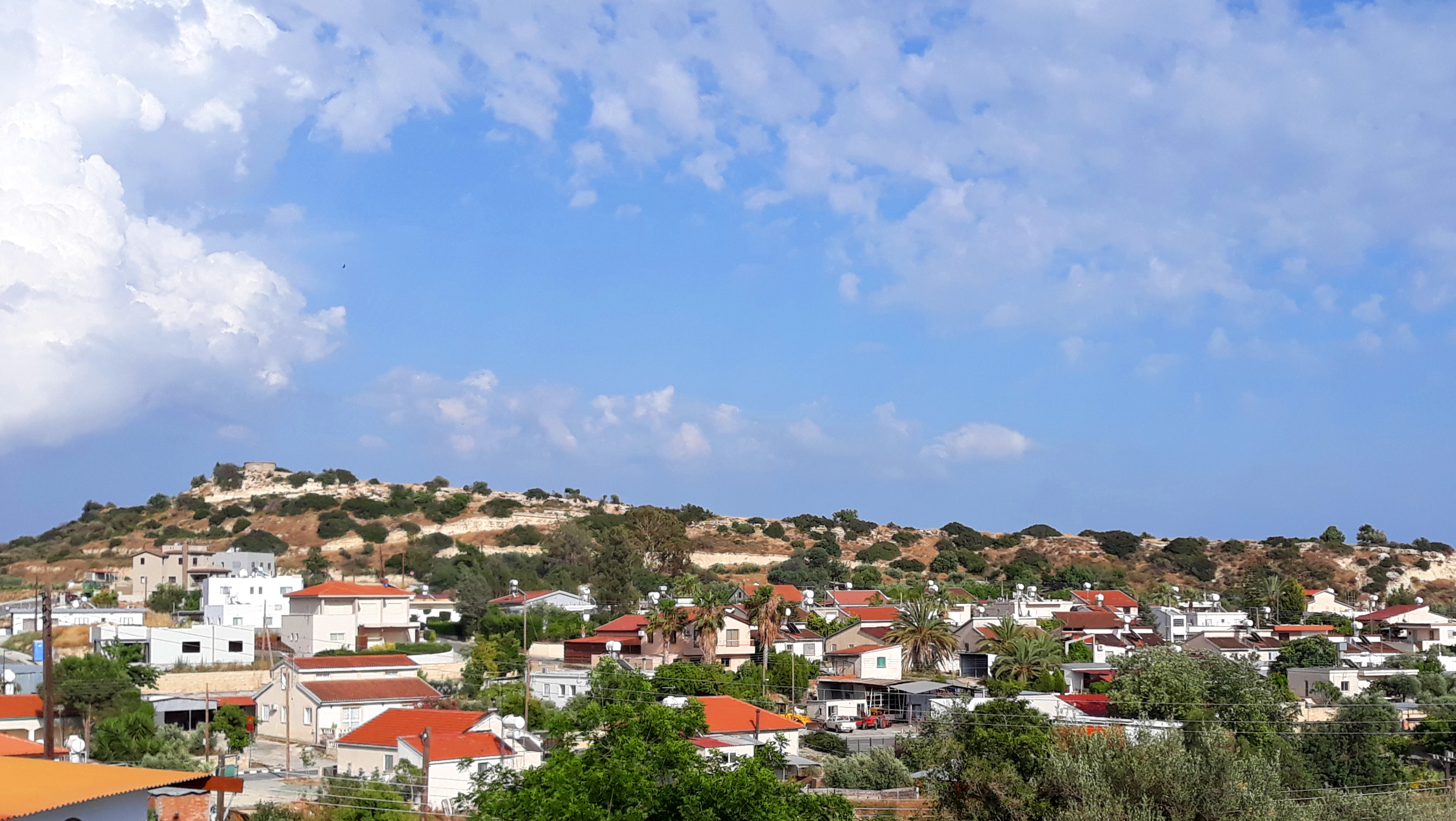

- Location within Cyprus
- Coordinates: 34°41′39″N 32°45′46″E
- Country: Cyprus
- District: Limassol District

Government
  - Mayor: Modestos Flourentzou

Population (2001)
  - Total: 614
- Time zone: UTC+2 (EET)
  - Summer (DST): UTC+3 (EEST)
- Postal code: 4600

Avdimou (Greek: Αυδήμου, Turkish: Evdim or Düzkaya) is a small village on the south coast of Cyprus, lying partly within the British Overseas Territory of Akrotiri and Dhekelia. Up to 1974 it was inhabited by a majority of Turkish-Cypriots, but following the Turkish invasion the Turkish Cypriot residents evacuated to the North. Greek Cypriot refugees from the North, who were forcibly evacuated, replaced all the Turkish Cypriot residents.

Historically agriculture was the main source of income for the village, primarily in the local vine, olive and carob plantations. However, the younger generations are switching to white collar employment in the nearby city of Limassol.
