= Akaki Castle =

- (Greek: Κάστρο του Ακακίου, Turkish: Akaki Kalesi)
- Interactive map of the Akaki Castle area

General information
- Architectural style: Medieval
- Location: Cyprus
- Coordinates: 35°8′0″N 33°7′45″E
- Construction started: c. 1310

Akaki Castle (Greek: Κάστρο του Ακακίου Turkish: Akaki Kalesi), also known as the Tower of the Franks (Greek: Πύργος των Φράγκων), is a castle in Cyprus. It served as a retreat for the kings of Cyprus. It is located near the village of Akaki, halfway between Nicosia and Morphou Bay.

== History ==
Following his return to Cyprus in 1310, King Henry II began arresting those responsible for his exile, among them was Balian II of Ibelin, Prince of Galilee. Balian's property at Akaki was confiscated, and a castle was erected to strengthen the King's authority in the area. Akaki remained a royal demesne and was described as a court, where Peter I of Cyprus spent several days hunting in January 1369. James II of Cyprus similarly used Akaki as a retreat from the plague that ravaged Nicosia from 1470 to 1473.

== Architecture ==
Next to nothing remains of Akaki today. A cylindrical tower 3.5 metres (11 ft) wide internally and with walls 1.1 metres (3.6 ft) thick sits at the site. Constructed of large stone blocks, the tower once had two to three floors as well as a small window above the remains of an internal staircase. Its small size indicates that it could accommodate up to three people.
