= Geology of Cyprus =

The southern margin of the Anatolian Plate is in collision with the African Plate, which has created the uplift of the Cyprus arc and Cyprus itself.

== Bedrock geology ==
Cyprus is commonly divided into four bedrock units. From north to south they are:

- Keryneia Terrane
- Troodos Ophiolite, surrounded by the Circum Troodos Sedimentary Succession
- Mamonia Terrane

=== Keryneia Terrane ===
The Keryneia Terrane occupies the northern margin of Cyprus, stretching from Cape Kormakitis in the west to Cape Andreas in the east. The terrane is a sequence of Permian to recent sediments. The carbonate rocks are divided into the Dhikomo, the Hilarion and the Sykhari Formation.

=== Troodos Ophiolite ===
An outcrop of the sheeted dyke complex of the Troodos ophiolite

The Troodos Ophiolite crops out in the central part of Cyprus in a northwest to southeast striking band. The lithospheric mantle crops out in the Troodos Mountains and in the Limassol Forest, Akapnou Forest, on the Akamas Peninsula and near Troullo. This slab of oceanic lithosphere was formed around 90 million years ago as part of the Neotethys seafloor (Meliata-Maliac-Vardar).

The Troodos Ophiolite is exceptional for the completeness of the section of oceanic lithosphere. The crust is composed of sheeted dykes, pillow basalts and marine sediments. The sediments are composed of deep-water shales and radiolarite. The mantle parts of the lithosphere are made of harzburgite and dunite (both peridotites), with about 50 to 80% of the minerals now transformed into serpentinite.

=== Mamonia Terrane ===
The Mamonia Terrane or Mamonia Complex is an assemblage of volcanic, sedimentary and metamorphic rocks. Outcrops are only found on the southwestern end of Cyprus (Paphos district).

It is thought that this assemblage was deposited between the Middle Triassic and the Upper Cretaceous and was thrust on to the southern margin of Cyprus from the Maastrichtian onwards well into the Cenozoic.

The Mamonia Terrane is divided into the Diarizos Group, the Agios-Fotios Group and the Agia-Varvara Formation.

=== Circum Troodos ===
The sediments that are autochthonous to Cyprus are called the Circum Troodos unit because they surround the Troodos. They were deposited between the Upper Cretaceous to the Pleistocene. Outcrops cover most of the island, with the exception of the Troodos Mountains, which rise free. As a result of uplift the sediments become progressively more shallow marine.

Map showing the active faults around Cyprus

== Seismic activity ==
Because of its location on the margin of a tectonic plate, Cyprus is prone to earthquakes. The ongoing phase of seismicity since the Miocene, has caused an abundance of earthquakes.

== See also ==
- Leaky transform fault
