= Malounta =

Malounta: Μαλούντα (Greek); Malunda (Turkish)
- Village
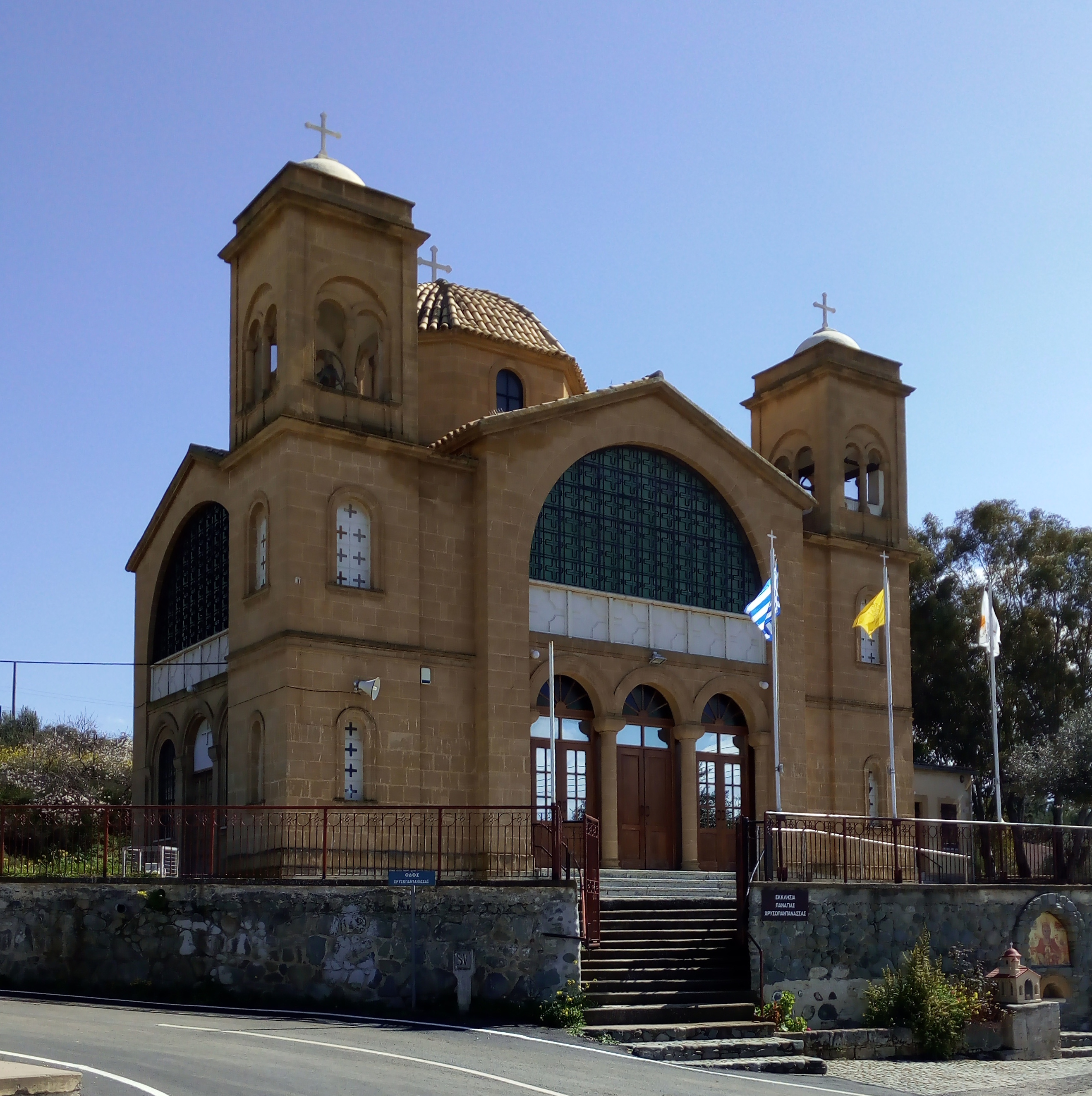
- Chrysopantanassa Church in Malounta

- Location in Cyprus
- Coordinates: 35°2′4″N 33°10′55″E
- Country: Cyprus
- District: Nicosia District

Population (2001)
  - Total: 402
- Time zone: UTC+2 (EET)
  - Summer (DST): UTC+3 (EEST)

Malounta (Greek: Μαλούντα; Turkish: Malunda) is a village in the Nicosia District of Cyprus, located 2 km north of Klirou.
