= Geology of Northern Cyprus =

The geology of Northern Cyprus includes the Troodos Massif, Kyrenia Range, the Cyprus Basin in the east.

== Geologic Summary ==
- Troodos Massif: The world's most heavily studied ophiolite, in the south and center of Northern Cyprus. Lower units include harzburgite interpreted as deformed mantle, overlain by massive gabbro, with dunite bodies left from mantle diapirs. It also includes trondjemite bodies, plagio-granite, chromite and dikes metamorphosed to zeolite and greenschist grade. These are covered by layers of extrusive rocks with sulfide mineralization and bounded by a fault lineament to the south. Pillow lavas are overlain by Mesozoic chert and volcaniclastic rocks as well as Cenozoic carbonates.
- Kyrenia Range: The range includes the oldest rocks in the region, in the form of Permian black shales. Shallow-water Paleogene olistrosomes and the Kantara Limestone are also important units. An active margin in the Quaternary drove uplift of the range, which had previously accumulated carbonates and turbidite.
