= Saranta Kolones =

Ruined medieval fortress on Cyprus

- (Greek: Κάστρο Σαράντα Κολώνες)
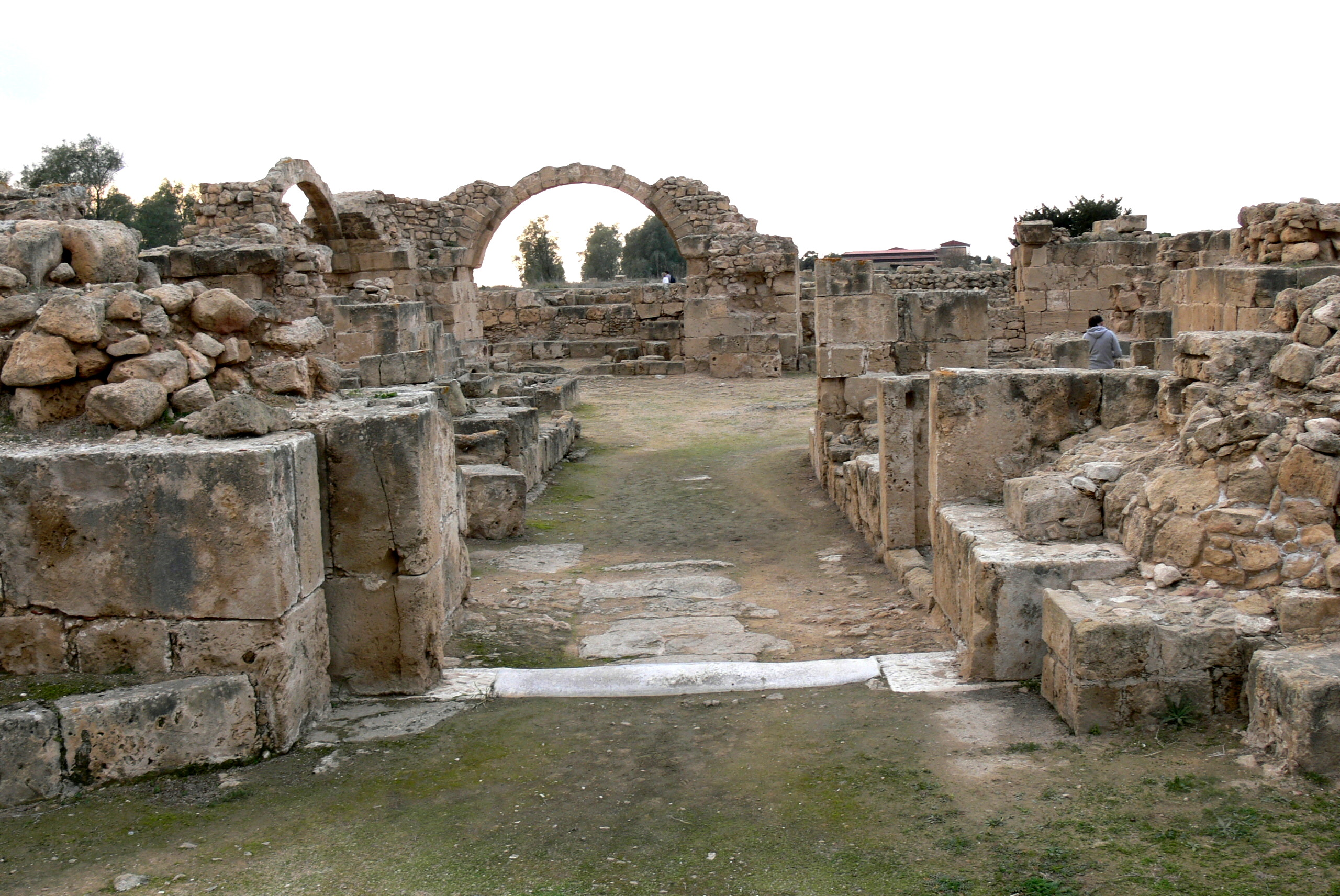

- Location within Cyprus

General information
- Architectural style: Medieval
- Location: Paphos, Cyprus
- Coordinates: 34.757656°N 32.409644°E

Saranta Kolones (Greek: Κάστρο Σαράντα Κολώνες, romanized: Kastro Saranta Kolones, lit. 'Forty Columns Castle') is a ruined medieval fortress on the island of Cyprus, near the city of Paphos. It takes its name from the large number of granite columns that were found on the site and probably once formed part of the ancient agora. The Byzantine castle is believed to have been built at the end of the 7th century AD to protect the port and the city of Nea Paphos from Arab raids and later remodeled by the Lusignans. The Fortress had a three-metre (9.8 ft) thick wall with four huge corner towers and another four intermediary towers along the joining walls and moat surrounding the castle. it was accessed from a wooden bridge spanning the moat. The square courtyard measured 35 by 35 metres (115 by 115 ft), with a tower at each corner. The main entrance was through a fifth, horseshoe-shaped tower on the east side. The castle was destroyed by an earthquake in 1222, and subsequently abandoned. A series of excavations have taken place in modern times.
