= Hellenic arc =

Mountain chain located on the southern margin of the Aegean Sea plate

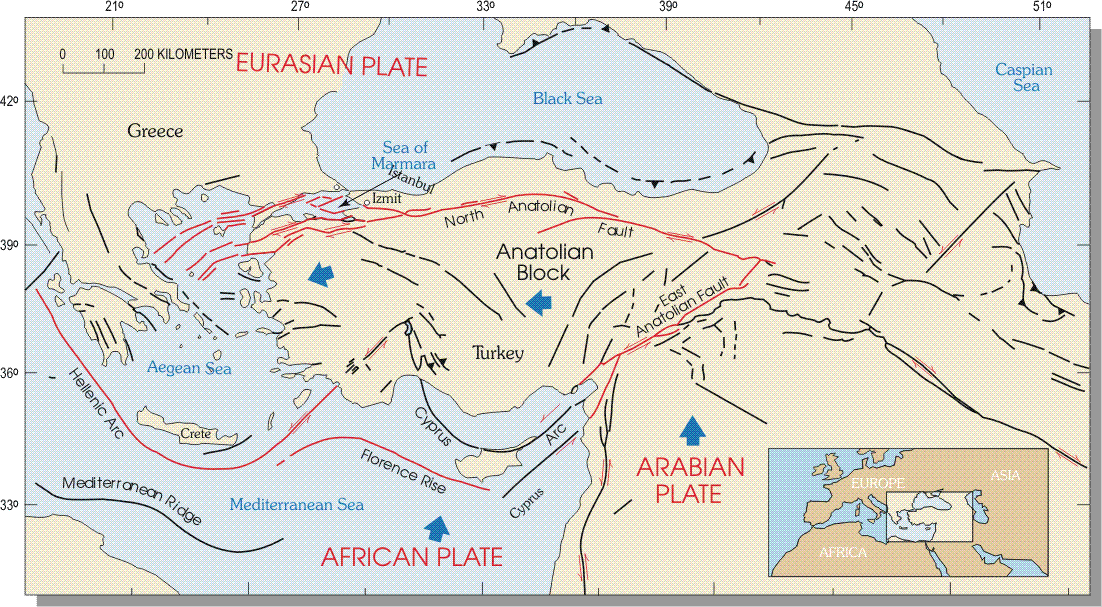
- A combined diagram of the Aegean and Anatolian plates. The southern margin of the Hellenic arc is shown, which is the trend line of the faults separating the arc and the Hellenic Trench. The body of the arc is the chain called the outer Hellenides, which includes west Peloponnesus, Crete, Rhodes, southwestern Turkey, and all the islands between.

- Hellas and the Aegean Sea middle arc (Greece)
- Etymology: Hellenic Republic (Greece)

Geography
- Location: The center of Crete is at about center of the arc
- Coordinates: 35°12′50″N 24°58′01″E
- Archipelago: southern outer Hellenides
- Adjacent to: Aegean Sea, Ionian Sea, Mediterranean Sea

Administration
- Greece

The Hellenic arc or Aegean arc is an arcuate mountain chain of the southern Aegean Sea located on the southern margin of the Aegean Sea plate. Geologically it results from the subduction of the African plate under it along the Hellenic subduction zone. The Hellenic Trench trends parallel to its southern side. The Aegean Sea plate, a microplate, is often considered part of the Eurasian plate from which it is in the process of diverging. The arc itself is mainly marine, the mountaintops appearing as islands in the Ionian Sea, Crete and its environs, or in the Dodecanese group. It encroaches on mainland terrain in the Peloponnesus, on Crete, on Rhodes, and on the southern coast of Anatolia, thus being encompassed by both Greece and Turkey.

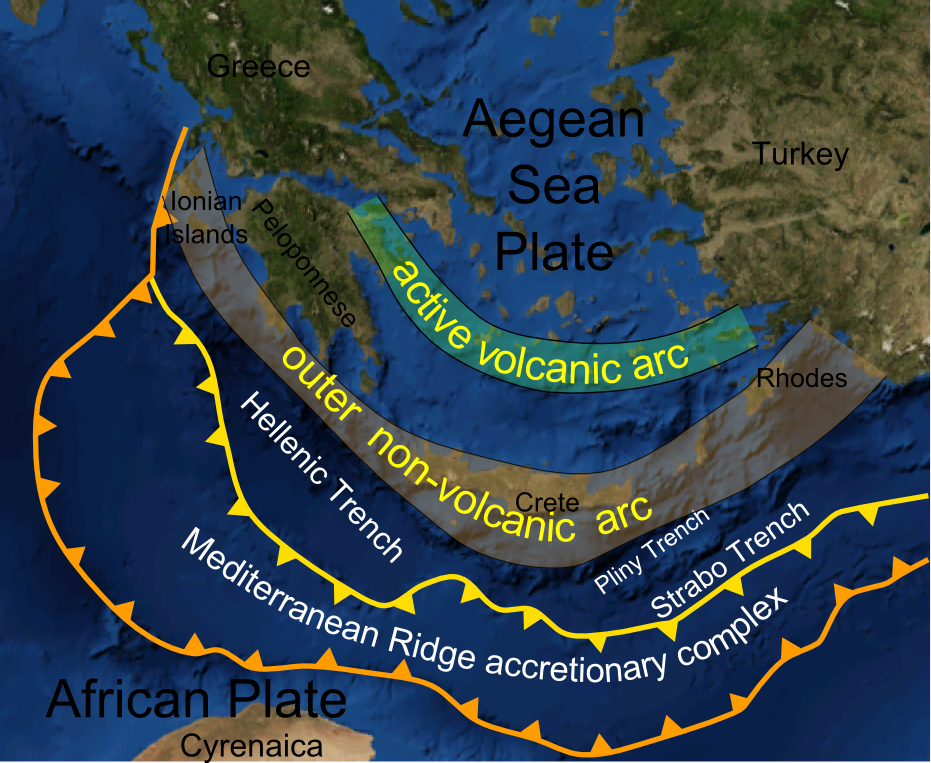
Tectonic map of the Hellenic arc

The direction of subduction is northward. Locations on the arc or near it on the north side are therefore called "outer" as they are at the outer margin of the plate. Locations further north are "inner." Generally the motion of subduction is from outer to inner. It so happens that, due to back-arc extension, the Hellenic Arc and Trench are moving in the reverse direction, from inner to outer, accounting for the severe arcuate form. There are in essence two layers at the subduction zone, a bottom one moving from outer to inner, and a top one moving from inner to outer.

The extension of the top layer required for this excursion of the arc and the trench comes from thinning of the back-arc ("in back of the arc"), weakening the crust there. There was already a mountain chain north of the arc, a legacy from the Alpine Orogeny, called the "inner arc." Its tops are the Cyclades. In addition, a chain of volcanos has appeared across it, due to magma breaking through the weakened crust; hence, this "inner arc" is termed the South Aegean Volcanic Arc. The two arcs are considered distinct, being from different orogenies. The term "Hellenic Arc" most often refers to the marginal, or "non-volcanic" arc, also called the Aegean forearc in the direction from outer to inner, which is consonant with the Hellenic Trench being the foredeep.

== Geometry of the Hellenic arc ==
The Hellenic arc extends from the Ionian Islands in the west to just east of the island of Rhodes in the east, where it links to the Cyprus arc.

== Development ==
The current geometry of the Hellenic arc is a result of the southwards migration of the subduction zone. This has led to extension both along the line of the arc as it bulged out and extension perpendicular to the arc, which is the current tectonic state.

== Seismicity ==
The Hellenic arc is one of the most active seismic zones in western Eurasia. It has regularly been the source for magnitude 7 earthquakes in the last hundred years of instrumental recording and the location for at least two historical events that were probably of about magnitude 8 or more, the 365 Crete earthquake and the 1303 Crete earthquake.

== See also ==
- Mediterranean Ridge
