= Larnaca Castle =

Castle in Larnaca, Cyprus

- (Greek: Κάστρο Λάρνακας; Turkish: Larnaka Kalesi)
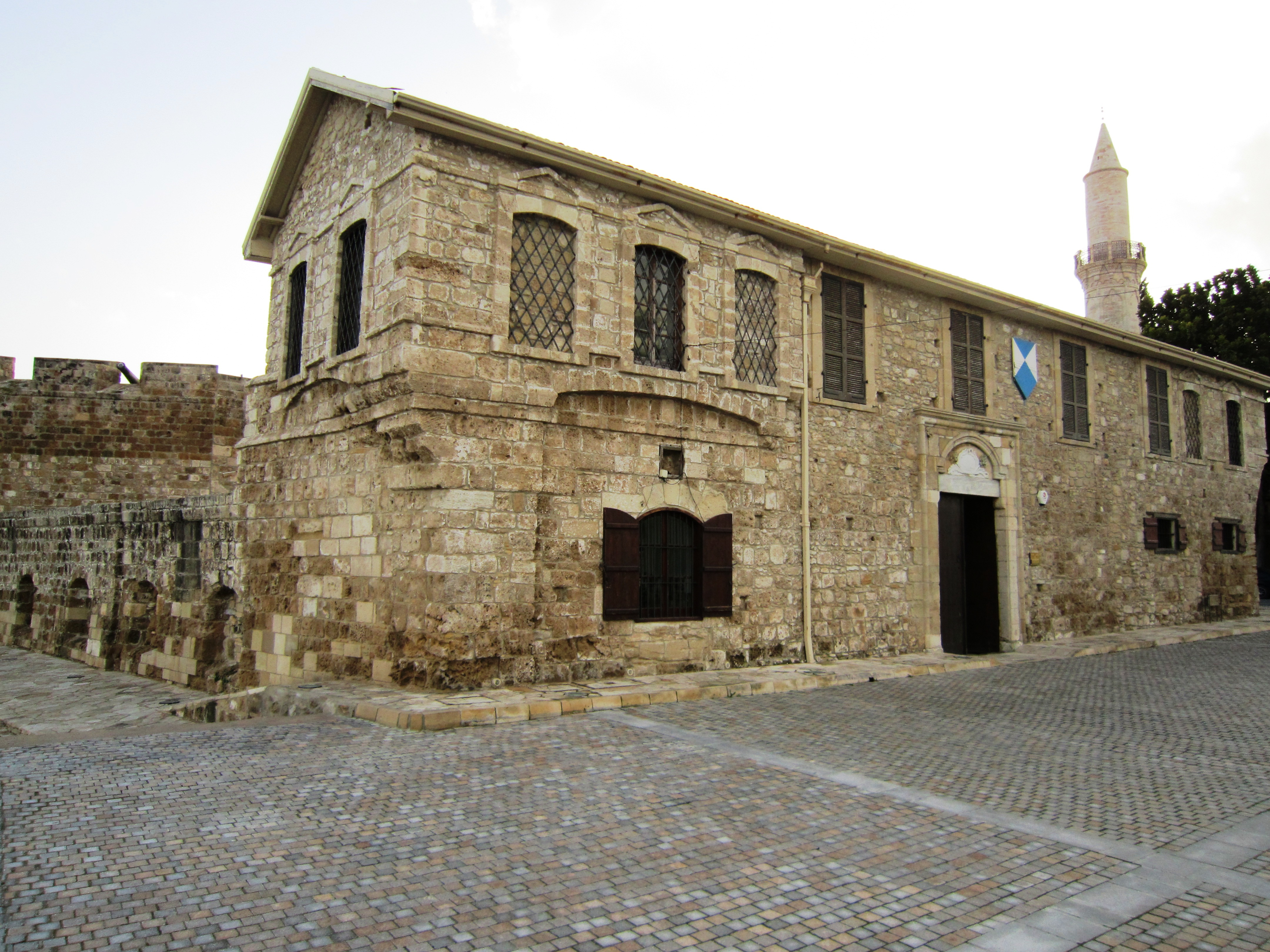
- Larnaca Castle

- Location within Cyprus

General information
- Architectural style: Medieval
- Location: Larnaca, Cyprus
- Coordinates: 34.910271°N 33.637694°E
- Construction started: 12th-century
- Owner: Cyprus Department of Antiquities

Larnaca Castle (Greek: Κάστρο Λάρνακας; Turkish: Larnaka Kalesi) is a castle on the southern coast of Cyprus. It was constructed to defend the southern coast of Cyprus and the harbour town of Larnaca and was later used as an artillery station, prison, and a museum.

== History ==
Larnaca has been inhabited since the 14th century BC when the Mycenaean-Achaeans Greeks founded a small town. Much later, the Byzantines constructed a small fort near its harbour. It is not clear when the Byzantine fort was first built but archeological research carried out around the castle suggest that initial construction started in late 12th century AD.

The city gained importance during the medieval ages after the Genovese occupied the main port of the country, Famagusta, and the need for a new port town emerged. Soon after Larnaca became one of the main ports of the Kingdom of Cyprus, and the need for a castle protecting the city and the harbour emerged. Between the years 1382 and 1398, during the reign of James I, the small Byzantine fortification near the harbour was upgraded to a more substantial castle.

By the 18th century the castle started losing importance and was abandoned. In the first half of the 18th century the explorer Abbot Giovanni Mariti, recorded that the castle was in a semi-ruined state; yet there was still a garrison protecting it. He theorised that the castle could have been built by the Ottomans due to its Turkish style and inscriptions.

Throughout British rule the castle was used as a prison where they installed a gallows to execute prisoners. The last execution took place in 1948. During the Cypriot intercommunal violence of 1958–1974 Greek Cypriots held the castle and used it as a prison.

== Current use ==
After Cypriot independence the castle itself was converted into a museum, while the castle courtyard was converted into an open-air theatre, accommodating 200 people. Antiques from early Christian, Byzantine, and post-Byzantine Cyprus are exhibited in the western room of the museum whilst Byzantine wall paintings are exhibited in the central room and medieval pottery, utensils, and weapons occupy the eastern room.

== Gallery ==
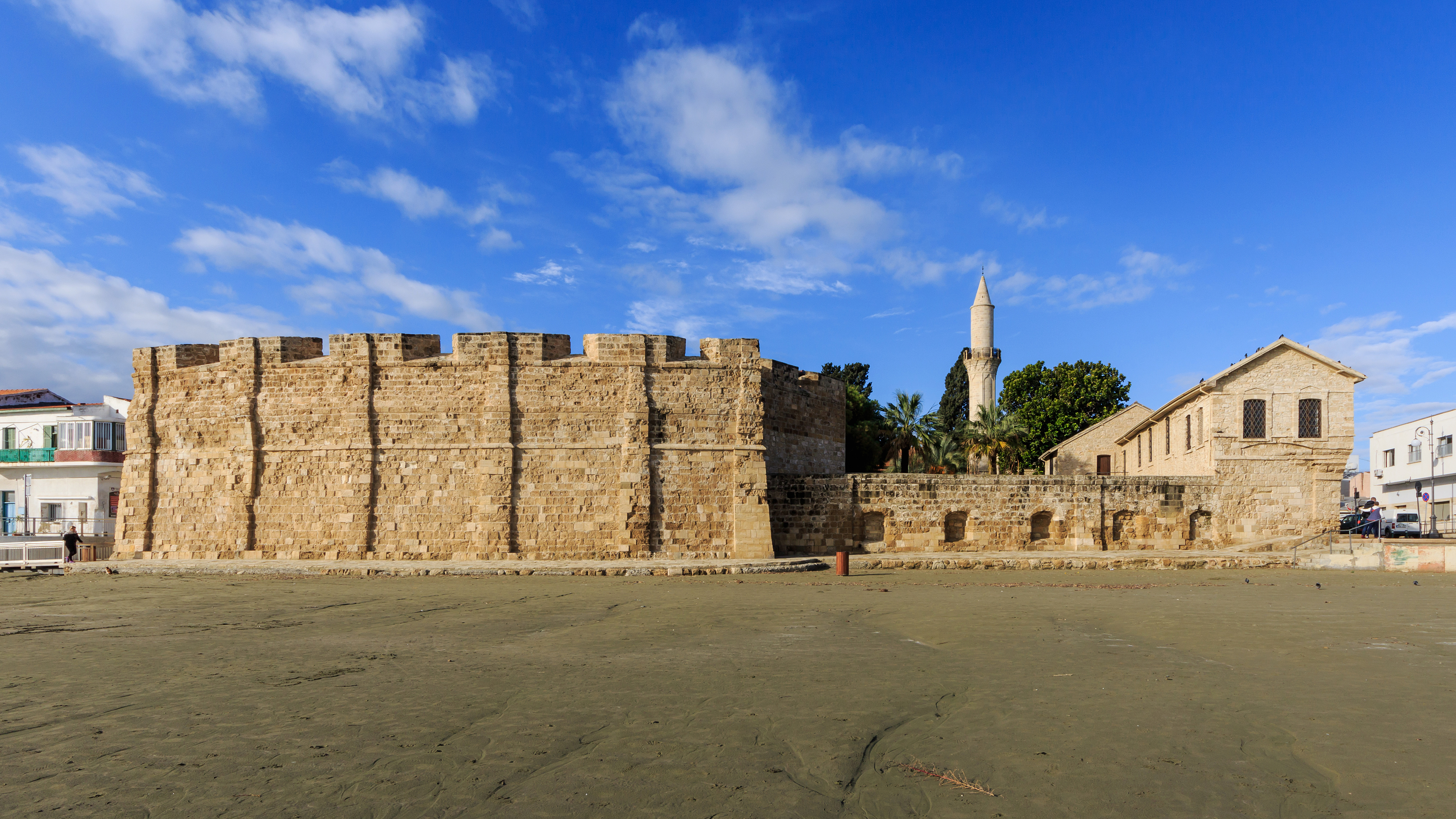
Exterior

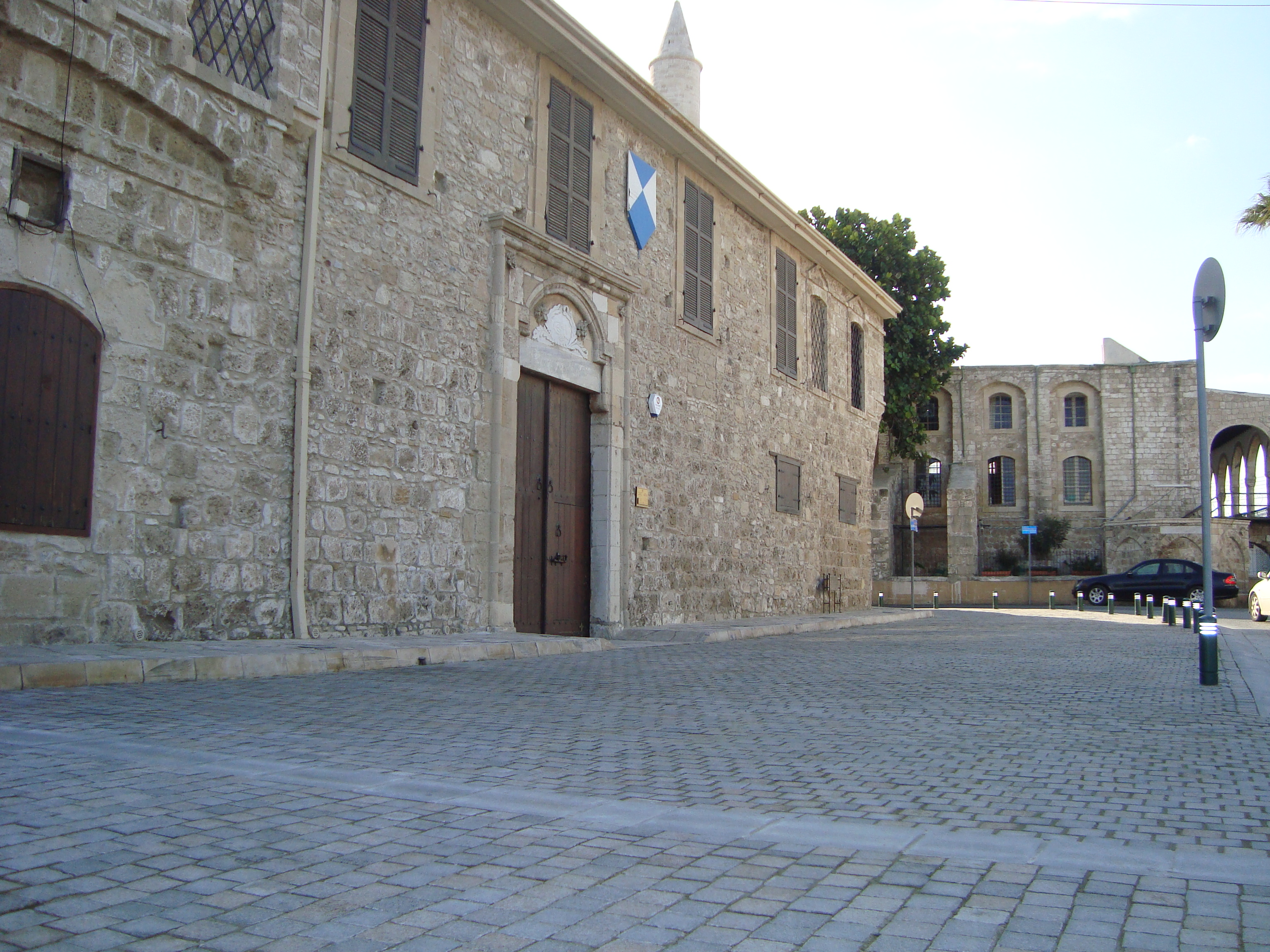
Entrance

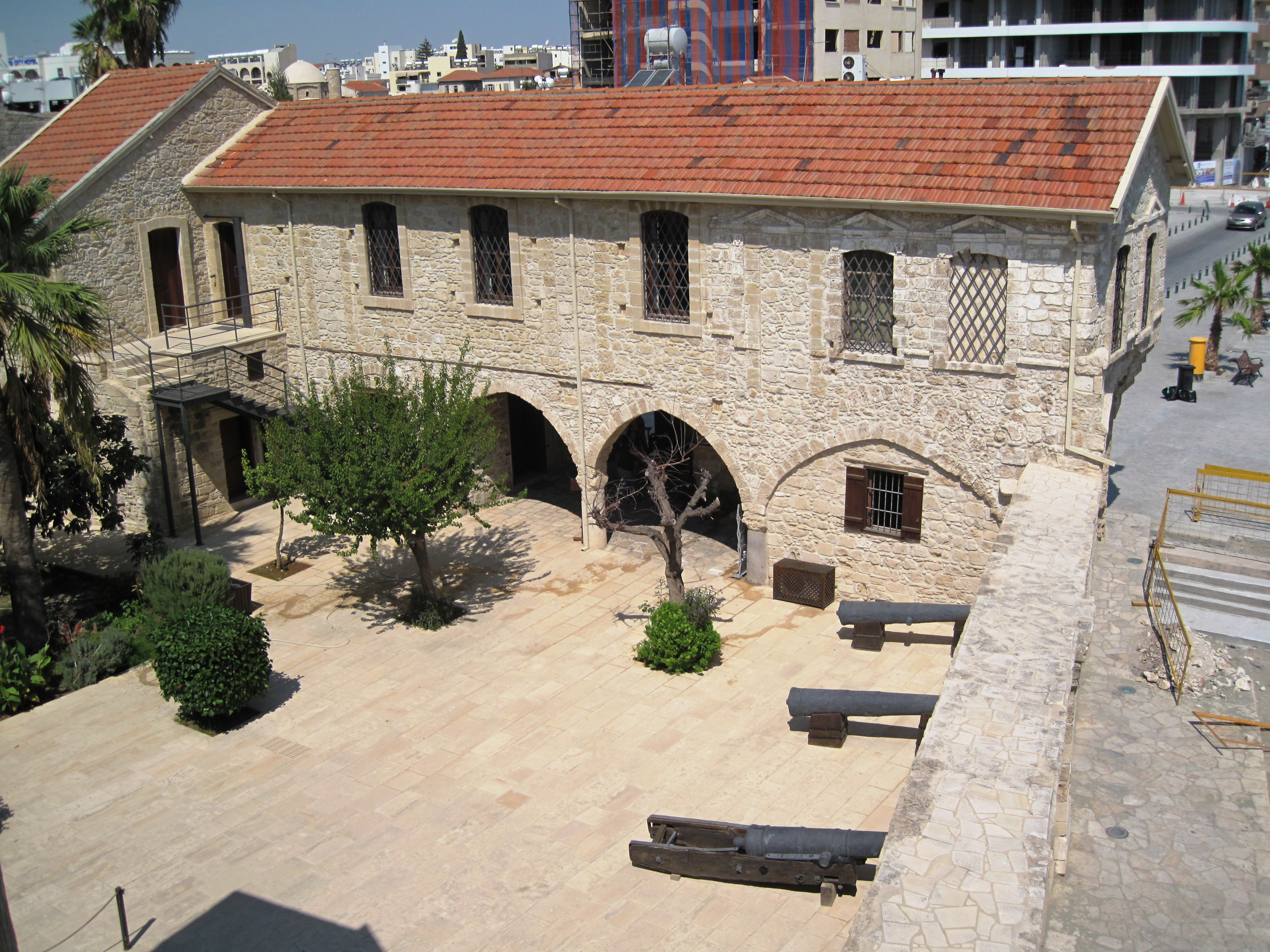
Interior

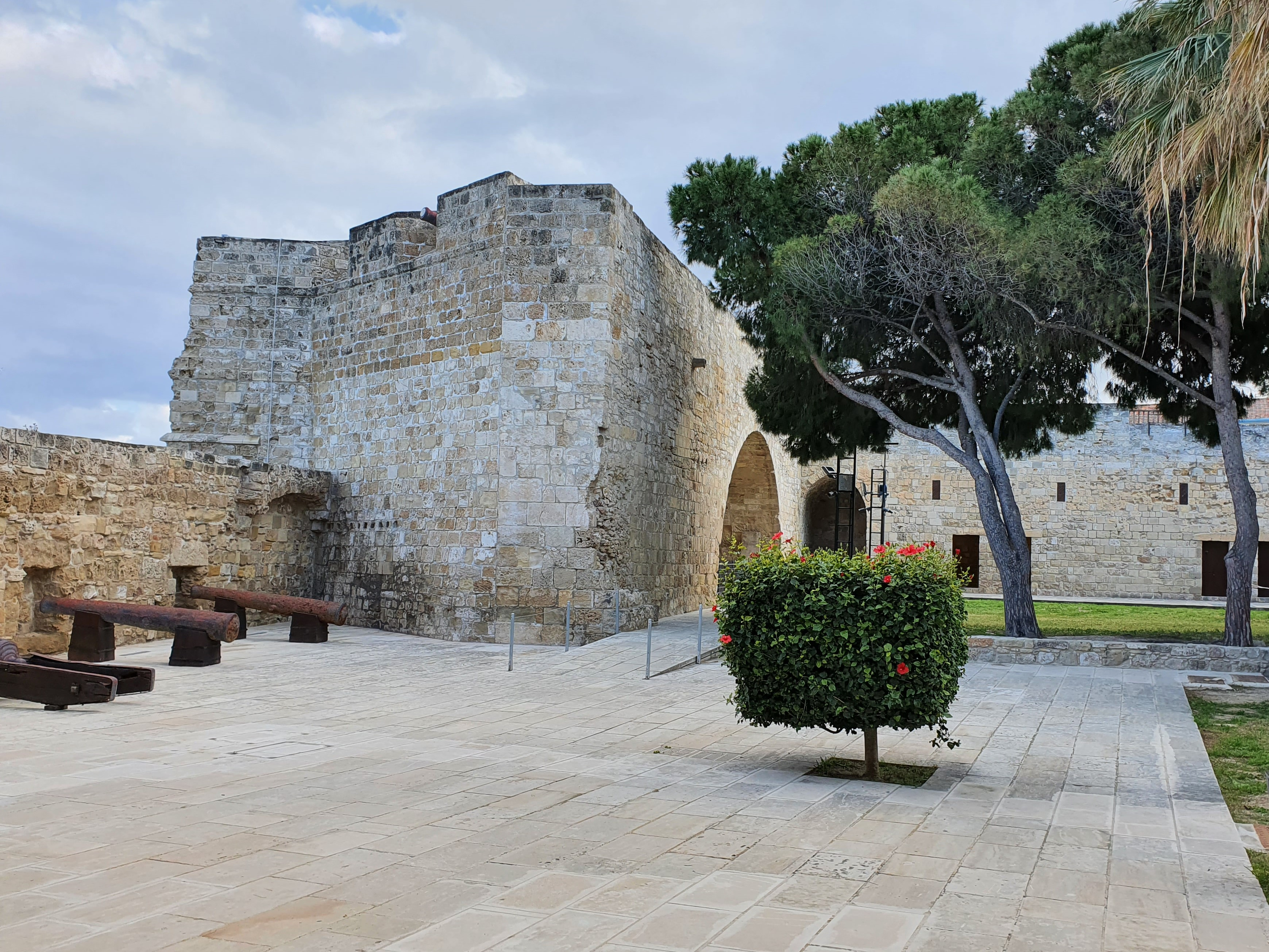
Interior

== See also ==
- List of Crusader castles
