= Anatolian plate =

Continental tectonic plate comprising most of the Anatolian Peninsula (Asia Minor)

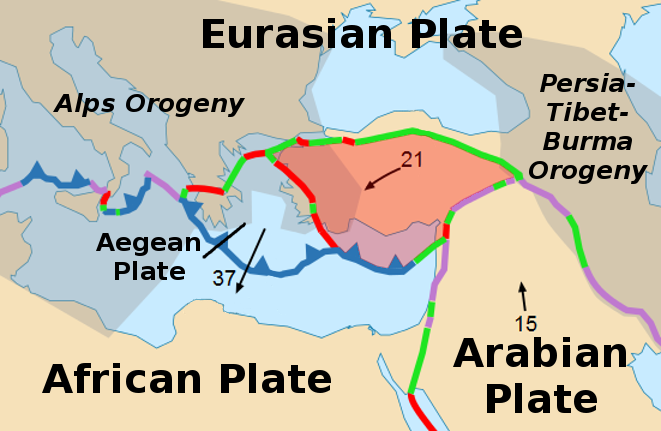
- Type: Micro
- Movement^{1}: South-west
- Speed^{1}: 21 mm/year
- Features: Anatolia
- ^{1}Relative to the African plate

Anatolian plate

The Anatolian plate is a continental tectonic plate lying under Asiatic part of Turkey, known as Anatolia. Most of the country of Turkey is located on the Anatolian plate. The plate is separated from the Eurasian plate and the Arabian plate by the North Anatolian Fault and the East Anatolian Fault respectively. According to the American Museum of Natural History, the Anatolian transform fault system is "probably the most active in the world".

Most significant earthquakes in the region have historically occurred along the northern fault, such as the 1939 Erzincan earthquake. The northern edge is a transform boundary with the Eurasian plate, forming the North Anatolian Fault zone (NAFZ). The East Anatolian Fault, a left lateral transform fault, forms a boundary with the Arabian plate. The devastating 2023 Turkey–Syria earthquakes occurred along the active East Anatolian Fault at a strike-slip fault where the Arabian plate is sliding past the Anatolian plate horizontally.

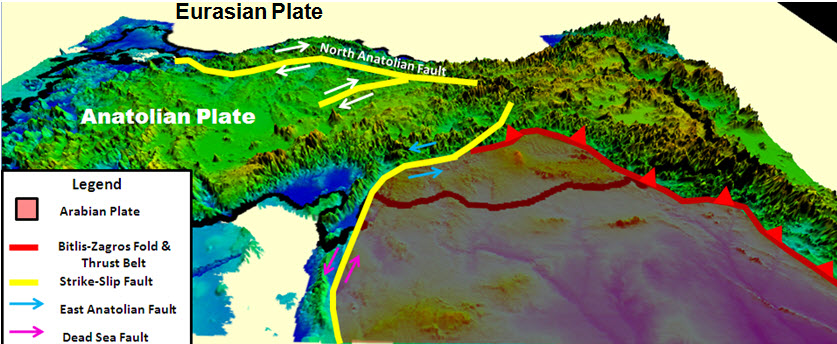
Anatolian and parts of Eurasian plate

To the south and southwest is a convergent boundary with the African plate. This convergence manifests in compressive features within the oceanic crust beneath the Mediterranean as well as within the continental crust of Anatolia itself, and also by what are generally considered to be subduction zones along the Hellenic and Cyprus arcs.

In some references, the Anatolian plate is referred to as a "block" or "sub-plate" of continental crust still coupled to the Eurasian plate, but studies of the North Anatolian Fault indicate that Anatolia is de-coupled from the Eurasian plate. Studies collecting and interpreting GPS data from this region show that the Arabian plate and Anatolian sub-plate are both being rotated counterclockwise. Additionally, the Anatolian plate's velocity increases towards the Hellenic and Cyprus trenches along the African-Eurasian subduction zone, moving at higher speeds than the Arabian plate. These observations, along with the absence of crustal shortening in the Anatolian plate normal to Arabian plate movement, indicate that suction from the African plate subducting and rolling back beneath the Anatolian plate is primarily responsible for the west/southwest movement of the Anatolian plate and the counterclockwise rotation of the region.

Previously, the crust under the Aegean Sea was described as a part of the Anatolian plate, and the different directions of motion were explained as the plate rotating counterclockwise (see above). Further measurements found that motion of the Aegean region differed from the previous model, so the Anatolian and Aegean Sea plate are now considered distinct from each other.
