= Cyprus Arc =

Plate boundary zone between the African plate and the Anatolian plate

Cyprus Arc

The Cyprus Arc is a curved plate boundary zone in the Eastern Mediterranean extending from the eastern edge of the Hellenic arc to the triple junction of the Anatolian Plate, Arabian Plate and African Plate. Unlike simpler plate margins, the Cyprus Arc accommodates simultaneous compression, extension and strike-slip movements along different segments, reflecting the complex interaction of three major plates. The arc is linked into the Latakia Ridge to the west via the East Anatolian Fault (EAF).

== Tectonic regime ==
Early models portrayed the Cyprus Arc as a straightforward zone of compression, where northward subduction of the Neo-Tethys oceanic lithosphere beneath the Anatolian Plate closed the eastern Mediterranean basin. In that view, the Eratosthenes Seamount—a promontory of extended continental crust—was thrust northward under the arc, uplifting the Troodos and eventually obducting slices of oceanic crust (ophiolite) onto the seamount's continental edge. GPS measurements, however, show that Anatolia is moving predominantly westward—at rates that increase from eastern Anatolia towards the Aegean Sea—contradicting the simple compression model. This westward motion is attributed to rollback of the Ionian subduction and consequent back-arc extension in the Aegean region.

== Composite deformation and geological evidence ==
Rather than a single, narrow fault line, deformation spreads across a 50 kilometres (31 mi)-wide zone east of the arc, forming a network of faults with both transtensional (extension plus strike-slip) and transpressional (compression plus strike-slip) character. Evidence for extension includes normal fault-related salt diapirs in the Cilicia basin and numerous extensional earthquake faulting south of Anatolia. Conversely, sinistral (left-lateral) transpressional earthquakes have been recorded off southwestern Cyprus and the Florence Rise. Seismic reflection profiles reveal typical flower structures where strike-slip and normal faults co-exist. Bathymetric mapping of the Rhodes basin further shows it links the Hellenic and Cyprus arcs through strike-slip and reverse fault segments, while boreholes on the Eratosthenes Seamount indicate it has downfaulted and subsided since the early Pliocene. The late Turonian–early Senonian rifting age of the Troodos Ophiolite matches the timing of regional extensional phases, confirming that ophiolite emplacement occurred during a period of complex, multi-stage deformation.

== Regional context and evolution ==
The Cyprus Arc forms part of a wider system of arcuate subduction zones, including the Calabrian and Hellenic arcs, which migrated during closure of the Neo-Tethys seaway. The ongoing westward escape of the Anatolian Plate—driven by collision with the Arabian promontory—has accelerated Aegean extension both east–west and north–south. As the last marine remnant of the Tethys contracts, the Levant basin will continue to shorten, Cyprus will migrate southwestward, the Cilician basin will widen, and Anatolia will advance further west. This dynamic setting makes the Cyprus Arc a natural laboratory for studying how compression, extension and strike-slip processes can interact over small distances to reshape continental margins.
