= 1513 Marash earthquake =

Major earthquake in Turkey

- Location within Turkey
- Local date: 28 March 1513
- Magnitude: Possibly two earathquakes, no larger than M_{s} 7.4
- Epicenter: 37.5°N 36.5°E

The 1513 Marash earthquake or Maraş earthquake allegedly affected Marash in 1513 or 1514. It followed about 400 years after the 1114 Marash earthquake and after about 500 years was followed by the 2023 Marash earthquake. Nicholas Ambraseys examined a 16-century account of the earthquake and inferred that the cities of Malatya, Tarsus and Adana were "almost totally destroyed" by an earthquake. Due to the distances between these cities spanning more than 340 km (210 mi), he suggested a minimum magnitude of 7.4. However, he warned of insufficient descriptions to accurately date the event and determine its felt area. Viviana Castelli and Massimiliano Stucchi later investigated additional documents and historic monuments in these towns but did not find evidence of a highly destructive event. Additionally, the timing of the earthquake coincided with conflicts involving the Ottoman, Safavid and Mamluk empires but there are no descriptions of destruction by an earthquake nor the relief efforts in the area. The pair suggested that the descriptions of earthquake damage were exaggerated and most likely the result of conflation of two separate and smaller events at different places.

The earthquake may have been felt as far as Cairo. A distant earthquake was felt from Cairo on 28 March 1513, however it is not known for certain if this was the same earthquake because some sources put the date of the Marash earthquake at 1514.

The earthquake was associated with rupture along the Pazarcık Segment and its magnitude was estimated at M_{s} 7.4. The previous major earthquake in this segment was the 1114 Marash earthquake roughly 400 years earlier which was also magnitude 7.4 or higher. With this earthquake now being over 500 years ago, data points towards a massive buildup of pressure in this zone as of 2018, making a next major earthquake in this zone likely. It was recommended to prepare for another earthquake that is magnitude 7.5.

== Sources ==
- Ambraseys, N.N. (1989). "Temporary seismic quiescence: SE Turkey". Geophysical Journal International. 96 (2): 311–331. Bibcode:1989GeoJI..96..311A. doi:10.1111/j.1365-246X.1989.tb04453.x.
- Afyoncu, Erhan (12 February 2023). "Kahramanmaraş ve çevresi tarih boyunca büyük depremlerle sallandı. Maraş bölgesi 1114, 1513, 1544 ve 1795'te depremlere maruz kaldı. Bunların içinde 1114 ve 1795'te meydana gelen iki büyük deprem, Maraş'ı tamamen harap etmiş ve binlerce insan ölmüştü". Sabah.
- Mut, Gürer (8 February 2023). "Aynı fayın, aynı segmenti kırılmıştı: 1114 ve 1513'te Maraş Pazarcık'ta neler olmuştu?". Hürriyet (in Turkish).
- Sünbül, Fatih; Sünbül, Ayşe Bengü (1 June 2018). "Deprem Etkileşimlerinde Coulomb Gerilme Kriteri Değerlendirmesi; Doğu Anadolu Fay Hattı" [Evaluation of Coulomb Stress Criteria in Earthquake Interactions; East Anatolian Fault Line]. Karaelmas Fen ve Mühendislik Dergisi (Research Article) (in Turkish). 8 (2). Zonguldak Bülent Ecevit University: 523–535. ISSN 2146-4987.
- Herece, E. (2008). Dogu Anadolu Fayi (DAF) Atlasi [Atlas of the East Anatolian Fault (EAF)=] (in Turkish). Vol. 4. General Directorate of Mineral Research and Exploration. Special Publications, Ankara. p. 359.
