= Hatay State Assembly Building =

Destroyed building in Antakya, Turkey

Coordinates: 36.20297°N 36.16069°E

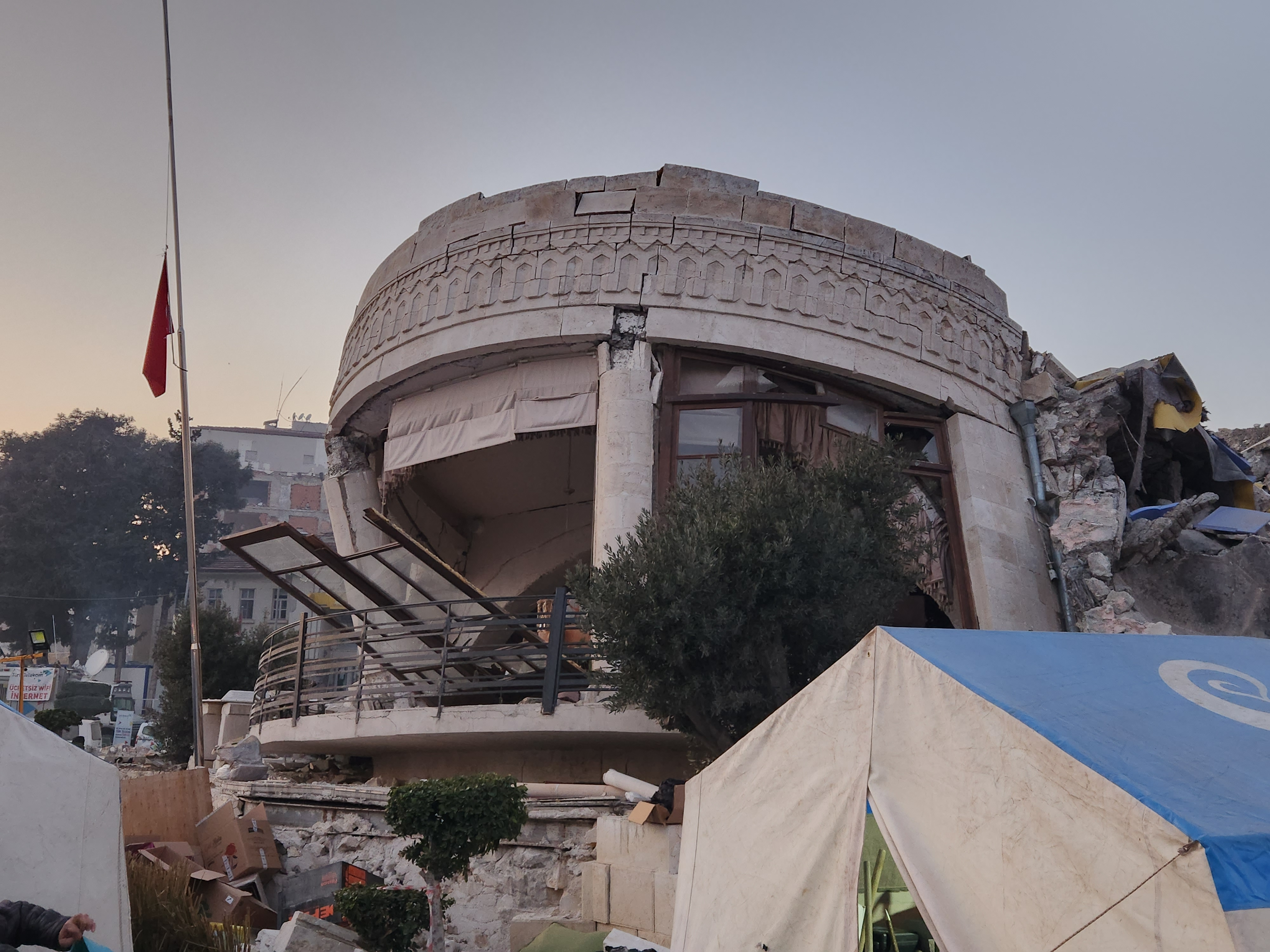
Destruction after the 2023 Turkey–Syria earthquake.

The Hatay State National Assembly Building was a historical building in Turkey designed by the French architect Leon Benju and used by the National Assembly of the State of Hatay in its early years. Located in Cumhuriyet Square in the center of Antakya, the building was destroyed during the 2023 Turkey-Syria earthquake.

== History ==
Designed by French architect Leon Benju and opened in 1927, the building was originally designed as a movie theater. In 1933, sound films started to be shown in the theater, including the first sound film of Turkish cinema, "Istanbul Sokakları'nda" (On the Streets of Istanbul). The building, which served as the "Empire Cinema" for about ten years, was converted into a parliament building after the establishment of the State of Hatay. On June 29, 1939, in line with a decision taken in said parliament, the building was converted into a cinema again when Hatay's accession to Turkey was being considered; it remained a cinema until the 1980s. The building, which was privately owned, was purchased by the Hatay Governorship in 2019 and converted into a cultural center. The building was largely destroyed in the 2023 Turkey–Syria earthquake.
