= New Mosque, Malatya =

Mosque in Malatya, Turkey

New Mosque
- Yeni Cami
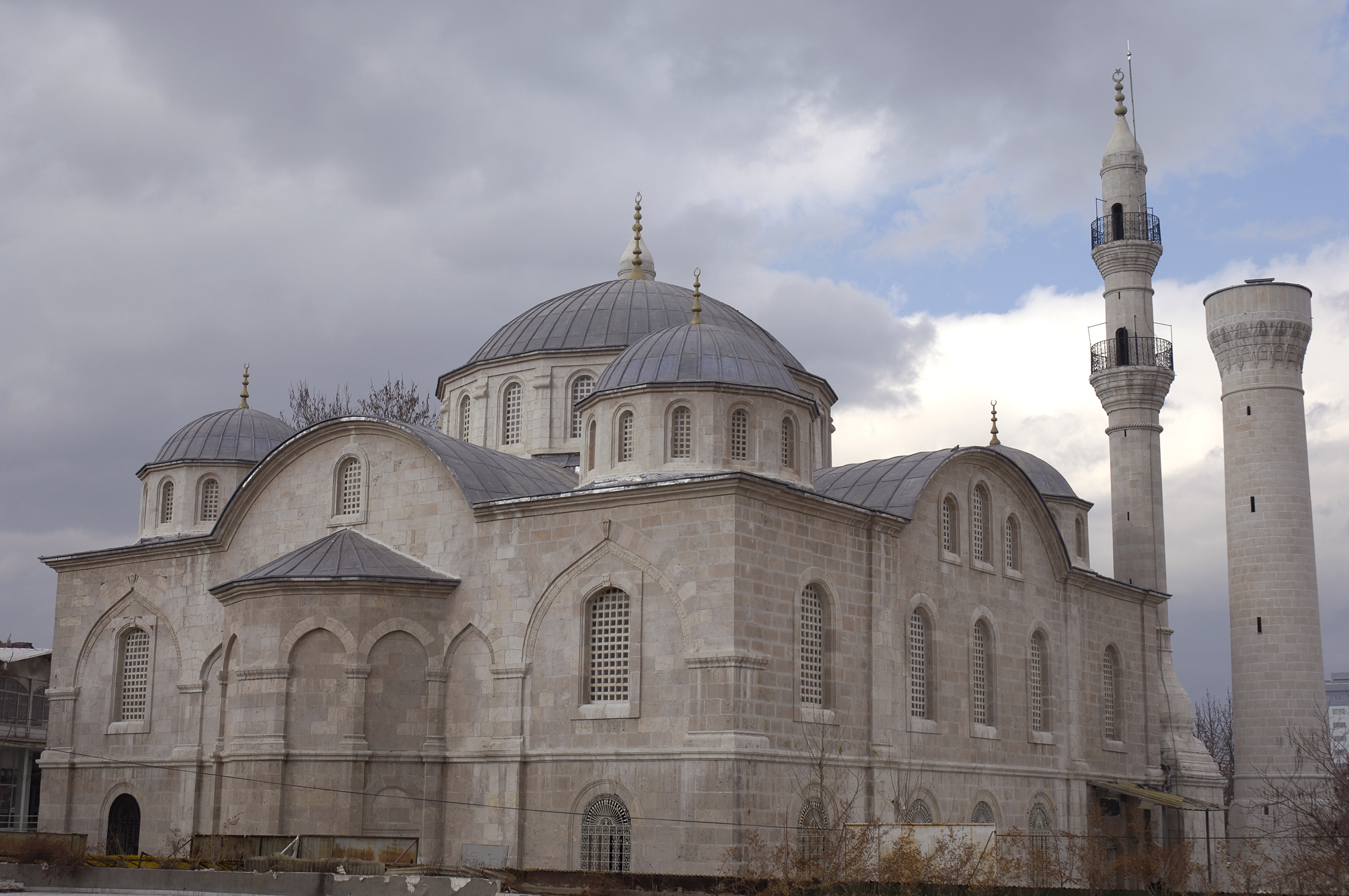
- New Mosque in 2005

- Location within Turkey

Religion
- Affiliation: Islam

Location
- Municipality: Malatya
- Country: Turkey
- Interactive map of New Mosque
- Coordinates: 38.3495°N 38.3181°E

Architecture
- Type: mosque
- Destroyed: 3 March 1894; 6 February 2023

The New Mosque (Turkish: Yeni Cami, pronounced [jeni dʒami] originally named the Hacı Yusuf Taş Mosque) is a mosque in Malatya, Turkey.

The original mosque was burned down in a fire in Malatya Bazaar in 1889, and was subjected to another fire in 1890 before it was repaired. Reconstruction began in 1893 and was damaged by an earthquake on March 3, 1893. It took until 1913 to complete the construction.

The rebuilt mosque was damaged by a 1964 earthquake and badly damaged in the 2023 Turkey–Syria earthquake.
