= Al-Tlul =

Coordinates: 36.2075°N 36.3986°E

Al-Tlul التلول
- Village
- Location in Syria
- Country: Syria
- Governorate: Idlib
- District: Harem District
- Subdistrict: Salqin Nahiyah

Population (2004)
  - Total: 1,703
- Time zone: UTC+2 (EET)
  - Summer (DST): UTC+3 (EEST)
- City Qrya Pcode: C4137

Al-Tlul or Al-Tloul (Arabic: التلول) is a Syrian village located in Salqin Nahiyah in Harem District, Idlib. According to the Syria Central Bureau of Statistics (CBS), Al-Tlul had a population of 1703 in the 2004 census.

== History ==
After the 2023 Turkey–Syria earthquake, and following heavy rains in the region, an earthen embankment on the Orontes River (the Al Talul packwall dam) failed, causing flooding to the surrounding area. Almost all of its residents were forced to leave the village; about 500 families were displaced. According to Reuters, citing local residents, between 35 and 40 people died and most buildings in Al-Tlul were damaged or destroyed by the earthquake.
