= Iron Gate (Antioch) =

Dam in Antakya, Turkey

- Bāb el-Ḥadīd
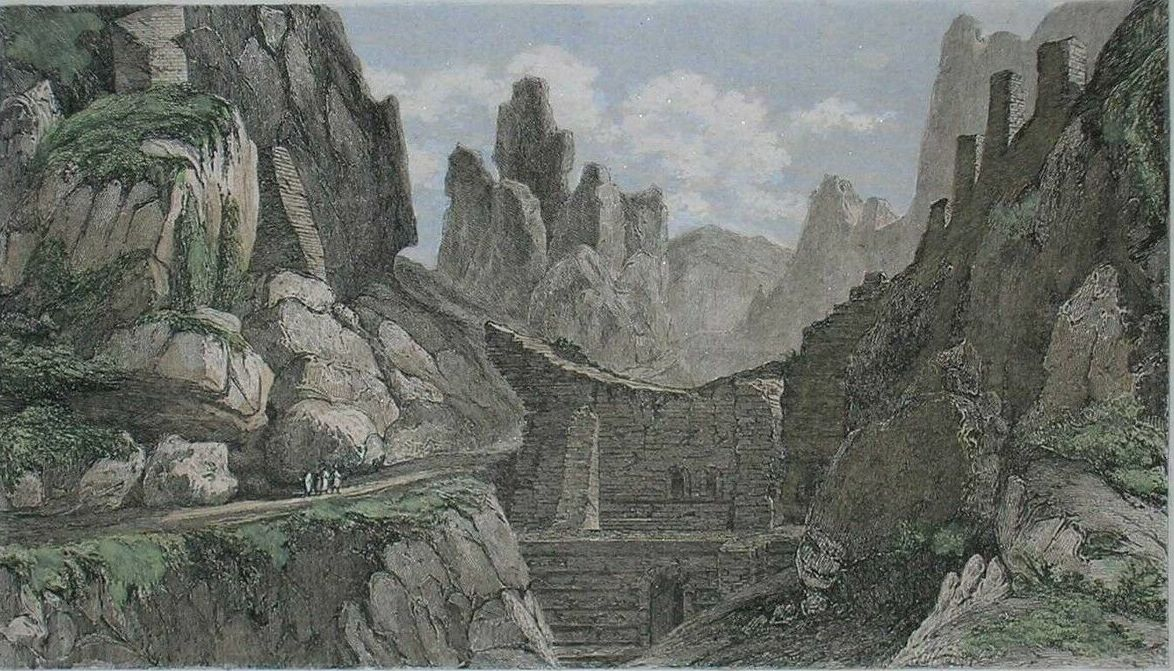
- Hand-coloured print, c. 1800
- Interactive map of Iron Gate
- 36°12′31″N 36°10′58″E
- Type: Dam, defensive wall
- Location: Antakya, Turkey

History
- Built: c. 555 AD

Site notes
- Material: Roman concrete with stone masonry additions
- Elevation: 150 m (490 ft)
- Height: 36 m (118 ft)
- Width: 30 m (98 ft)

The Iron Gate (Arabic: بَاب الْحَدِيْد, romanized: Bāb el-Ḥadīd) is a sixth-century dam located in the mountains to the east of Antakya (ancient Antioch) in Turkey. It is one of the earliest known arch dams and is the oldest to survive. It was built in the mid–sixth century on the order of the Byzantine emperor Justinian I to impound and slow the waters of the Parmenios stream, which in the rainy season could cause torrential floods endangering Antioch's city centre. Previous attempts to channel the floodwaters into underground passageways had not fully solved the problem.

The Iron Gate is one of the few ancient structures for which a contemporary technical report of its construction, provided by the Byzantine historian Procopius in his On Buildings, survives. The structure integrated a former aqueduct and bridge into its construction, and additionally carried part of Antioch's city wall. Its innovative arched structure redirected the pressure of the water reservoir into the rock cliffs on either flank. The structure also included a city gate on one side of the dam: Strongly fortified, it was probably the source of the name "Iron Gate".

In the medieval period, the Iron Gate was damaged by a flood too big for the existing outlets to handle; the waters overtopped the dam and caused the collapse of the city wall. The wall was reconstructed with improvements, including additional outlets, to prevent another collapse. As Antioch declined in importance, the structure was gradually abandoned. Looting of building materials caused the collapse of most of the side structures, leaving only the dam and some of the rebuilt city wall on top, and rendering it vulnerable to further erosion or even total collapse; nevertheless, it is still functioning as a dam.

== Background ==
=== Antioch ===
The Parmenios torrent descended from between the Silpius and Staurin mountains to travel through the city and reach the Orontes River.

The city of Antioch was founded in 300 BC by Seleucus I Nicator, one of the successors of Alexander the Great and the founder of the Seleucid Empire. Located at a strategically important location on the Orontes River in Syria, close to trade routes and with access to the Mediterranean Sea, Antioch became one of the most important cities in the Eastern Mediterranean. It was the capital of the Seleucid Empire between 240 and 63 BC, and thereafter a regional capital of the Roman Republic and empire. Its peak Roman-era population has been estimated at approximately 500,000 people. Antioch, often threatened by the Sassanid Persians, was conquered by the Muslim Umayyads in 640 AD. The city was the capital of the Principality of Antioch during the Crusader era, between 1098 and 1268. Damaged by sieges, earthquakes, and changing trade routes, Antioch became less important under the Mamluk Sultanate and the Ottoman Empire. Its ruins are located under the modern city of Antakya.

One significant drawback of Antioch's location was its vulnerability to hydrological processes. On the western side, the Orontes flooded each year during the rainy season, spreading debris and silt along its banks. At the same time of year (between October and April) the torrential rains would cause large amounts of runoff from the mountains Silpius and Stauris on Antioch's eastern flank. Much of the city was therefore inundated on a yearly basis by soil and mud. Attempts to corral the water through a complex network of drains, conduits, aqueducts, and dams would fail over centuries; the deposition of alluvial material became so great that an island in the Orontes River disappeared and the ancient city has been buried 10 metres (33 ft) deep. The situation was further worsened by the location's tectonic instability. Antioch sits atop the Al-Chab fault near the Marash triple junction of the Anatolian plate, the African plate and the Arabian plate. The earthquakes of 115, 526, and 528 AD caused huge devastation, but even minor shifts damaged structures, especially aqueducts.

=== The Parmenios stream ===
The most threatening mountain stream was the Parmenios (Παρμένιος), since renamed the Haci Kürüş Deresi, which carved out the gorge between Silpius and Stauris and then flowed down into the Orontes. Its colloquial name was the Onopniktes (Ὀνοπνίκτης), or "Donkey-Drowner", because, in addition to flooding the city center, its flash floods could easily drown pack animals in its ravine, which was occasionally used as a road to Apamea and eastern Syria. By the 4th century AD at the latest, and possibly as early as Hellenistic times, two huge masonry vaulted tunnels had been constructed to conduct the Parmenios under the area of the Forum of Valens and Antioch's main street.

Nevertheless, as described by the sixth-century writer Procopius, the problem was not solved:

It is proper to describe also ... the torrent which comes down from these mountains. Two precipitous mountains rise above the city, approaching each other quite closely. Of these they call the one Orocassias and the other is called Staurin. (Note: Orocassias is the mountain usually called Silpius, with its name here relating to the Casius mountains to the south which end at Antioch.) Where they come to an end they are joined by a glen and ravine which lies between them, which produces a torrent, when it rains, called Onopnictes. (Note: Procopius's usage of the colloquial name indicates that he was likely personally acquainted with Antioch's topography.) This, coming down from a height, swept over the circuit-wall and on occasion rose to a great volume, spreading into the streets of the city and doing ruinous damage to those who lived in that district.

=== Initial structures ===
Aqueduct structure, c. 300

There had long been a structure spanning the Parmenios at the site of the Iron Gate, the only location where crossing the ravine without being threatened by floods was possible. The first structure, probably built in the Seleucid era, was an 2.2-metre (7.2 ft) wide arch bridge for foot travellers and beasts of burden, who could traverse the valley floor 18 metres (59 ft) below over a brick arch 13.5 metres (44 ft) wide founded on the rocks at each side of the ravine. Following Pompey's capture of Antioch for the Roman Republic in 64 BC, this route would have cut travel times to the booming town of Laodicea by several hours. Around 300 AD, this bridge was converted to carry an aqueduct (the road likely then rebuilt on top) transporting water to Diocletian's imperial construction projects on the Orontes island, from the springs which also supplied water to the suburb of Daphne. However, after an earthquake in 458 AD severely damaged both the imperial residence and a bridge across the Karakiz Deresi gorge further upstream, the aqueduct was abandoned. (Note: The historian Glanville Downey argued that this structure likely also included some damming functionality; however, there is no archaeological evidence to support such a theory.)

Antioch suffered many disasters during the sixth century, including a great fire in 525; the two devastating earthquakes in 526 and 528; its capture in 540 by the Sassanid ruler Khosrow I, who pillaged the city and deported its population to build a new city, Weh Antiok Khosrow, in Mesopotamia; and the impacts of a great epidemic of plague in the 540s. In the aftermath, the emperor Justinian I initiated a construction programme to restore Antioch, renamed Theopolis ("City of God") in an attempt to win back divine favour. Particularly relevant was the consolidation of the city walls, which were deemed unfeasibly long and vulnerable in the aftermath of the Persian sack. Justinian's wall excluded Antioch's northern quarter and the Orontes island, and diverted part of the river to run alongside the western walls to act as a moat.

On the opposite side of the city, the settlement of Epiphaneia on Mount Staurin was also excluded, meaning the city walls traversed the ravine of the Parmenios. The already-present arch bridge was reinforced with a new arch, also 2.2 metres (7.2 ft) wide, on its outer side. The city wall, built using both the opus mixtum and the opus vittatum techniques, measured 3 metres (9.8 ft) wide and 18 metres (59 ft) tall. Its width necessitated that the old aqueduct bore part of its weight, and so the road atop the aqueduct became too narrow for pack animals. A new road was thus built on the slopes of Staurin, with a gate through the wall. This strongly-fortified opening, probably the source of the name "Iron Gate", was 2.5 metres (8.2 ft) wide and 5 metres (16 ft) high. It survived until at least 1939, although it appears to have been partially closed off to offer attackers less of a weak point.

== Construction and design ==
The Iron Gate c. 550

A few years after the modification, (Note: The construction of the city wall and the dam must have, according to the archaeologist Gunnar Brands, "a certain temporal proximity", because of the similarity of the construction techniques, including the height of the brick bands and the composition of the mortar.) Justinian decided to construct a dam underneath the arch bridge to help prevent the floods of the Parmenios. Procopius, who had a special interest in hydraulic engineering, provides one of the few contemporary technical reports available for any ancient infrastructure project:

Before that part of the circuit-wall which happens to lie nearest to the ravine out of which the torrent was borne against the fortifications, he [Justinian] built an immense wall or dam, which reached roughly from the hollow bed of the ravine to each of the two mountains, so that the stream should no longer be able to sweep on when it was at full flood, but should collect for a considerable distance back and form a lake there. And by constructing sluice-gates in this wall he contrived that the torrent, flowing through these, should lose its force gradually, checked by this artificial barrier, and no longer violently assault the circuit-wall with its full stream, and so overflow it and damage the city, but should gently and evenly glide on in the manner I have described and, with this means of outflow, should proceed through the channel wherever the inhabitants of former times would have wished to conduct it if it had been so manageable.

Procopius' identification of the location of the dam relative to the wall with the phrase πρὸ τοῦ περιβόλου, translated above as "before that part of the circuit-wall", caused some dispute among historians of Antioch. The scholar Richard Förster, writing in 1897, understood this to mean that the dam was built outside the new wall; the mid-20th-century historian Glanville Downey argued the opposite. The archaeologist Gunnar Brands, writing in the early 21st century, notes that Downey's proposed arrangement would have been useless in practice as the Parmenios would have first encountered the city wall, which was not built to allow controlled drainage, before building up at the purpose-built dam. Förster's arrangement is more practical, but only if there were a very short distance between dam and wall – otherwise, the same issue with water striking the city wall would reoccur, with the added issue that the dam would be vulnerable to attack. "Under these circumstances," Brands argues, with the help of archaeological investigation, "πρὸ τοῦ περιβόλου should be understood as an addition directly connected to, i.e., as a single structural unit with, the city wall."

Cross section of Justinian's Iron Gate

The first known arch dam is the Glanum dam, built 500 years earlier in France, but the Iron Gate is the only known surviving ancient structure of the type. The hydraulic engineer Mathias Döring, terming it a precursor of modern arch dams and thus fourteen centuries ahead of its time, notes that the dam is not just surviving, but is still active. The location of the Iron Gate, at a narrow span above a 35-metre (115 ft) cliff, was critical for its conversion into an arch dam, allowing for the redirection of water pressure into the lateral flanks by using a horizontal arch. Döring has calculated that 30–50% of the water pressure behind the dam was redirected at right angles into the rock flanks, while 50–70% dissipated tangentially through friction with them. This innovative design not only reduced construction time and materials usage but also, relative to traditional gravity dams, increased the potential capacity of the reservoir behind the Iron Gate.

The dam was 7.1 metres (23 ft) wide in total: 4.4 metres (14 ft) wide under the arch bridges and with an additional 2.7-metre (8.9 ft) thickness on the outside edge. It was constructed using opus caementicium (Roman concrete) faced with small ashlars on the facades. To strengthen the bonding of the concrete infill, layers of ashlars and multi-layers of bricks were included in the structure. Remnants of the initial arch bridges, which were incorporated into the lower dam structure, are clearly visible on the city-facing side of the Iron Gate. The dam had a maximum height of around 18 metres (59 ft). The structure had two outlets for the water of the Parmenios. The one at the bottom allowed smaller floods to pass with no need for damming. Meanwhile a square spillway (sides 1.8 metres (5.9 ft) long) at the height of the former aqueduct allowed increased flow in the case of severe floods which filled the dam's reservoir to capacity. Manual human intervention was never required, as is also the case with modern retention basins. The original name of the dam is unknown.

The two main risks to the dam were earthquakes and floods. The former, if they did not result in immediate collapse, might weaken the dam's structural cohesion. Floods, on the other hand, threatened to cause immediate damage: if the small outlets were blocked by debris, as commonly happened, floodwaters would have quickly filled the reservoir (which had a 5,000 square metres (54,000 ft^{2}) surface area) behind the dam wall and begun exerting pressure on the unprotected city wall.

== Medieval history ==
Diagrams of the collapse of the city wall (top) and its reconstruction (bottom). The single side spillway was replaced with two larger spillways set into the reconstructed city wall.

An incident of this nature happened during the medieval period: A large flood proved too much for the bottom outlet and single spillway to handle, and, overtopping the dam section which remained undamaged, caused the collapse of a 30-metre-wide (98 ft) portion of the city wall, in addition to the aqueduct and path. Parts of the city-side facade of the dam were also damaged. The flood may have been caused by a blockage in the barrel-vaulted bottom outlet, which may have contained a grate to protect against attacks, but which debris or mud could rapidly adhere to.

The subsequent rebuild of the city wall incorporated the remains of the ancient structure, fresh limestone blocks, and spolia (repurposed masonry). Inscriptions in Kufic and Arabic indicate that some gravestones from a nearby Muslim cemetery were used in the repairs, showing that the reconstruction took place after the Islamic conquest of Antioch, likely between 900 and 1200. Three large piers were added at lateral angles to support the structure; the dam's city-facing facade was rebuilt 45 centimetres (18 in) inwards, meaning the aqueduct and path overhung beyond it; and the single spillway which had proved insufficient was replaced with two larger spillways set into the city wall. This medieval upper structure is still visible.

The Iron Gate functioned well for many years after the city wall's collapse. In 1137, the crusader prince Raymond of Poitiers used the Gate to enter Antioch shortly before a Byzantine army besieged it. It was mentioned in Arabic writings such as the late medieval Codex Vaticanus Arabus 286, written by an anonymous author, which identifies it as one of the seven gates of Antioch; the c. 1200 work of Abu al-Makarim, which describes the valley of the Khaskarout (Parmenios) as guarded from floods by an iron window with a bridge and a gate; and the 13th-century scribe Ibn Abd al-Zahir, who noted that the Iron Gate controlled the floods into the city by diverting them into two underground passages called al-Būlīṭ and al-'Āwiya. It was listed as being in use as a city gate as late as 1500. However, as Antioch declined, the Gate was eventually abandoned. Portions of the main dam collapsed before 1800 for an unknown reason.

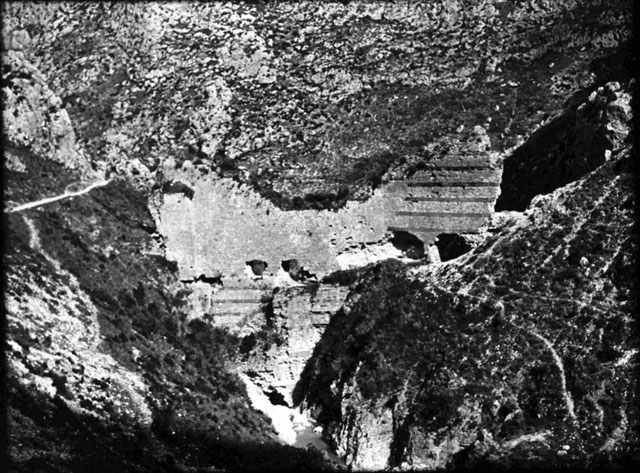
The Iron Gate in 1905. A portion of wall (right) around the eponymous city gate was then still intact, if weakened by extensive stone robbery.

In the early modern era, the Iron Gate was a major tourist attraction for visitors to Antioch. Many produced illustrations which still survive; these, however, tend to ignore or interpret elements of the structure relevant to its function as a dam, as the Iron Gate was thought of as a purely defensive construction. The first detailed investigation was carried out by a team from Princeton University in the 1930s.

== Modern condition ==
Diagrams of the Iron Gate in 1939 (top) and in 2008 (bottom). The city wall around the gate collapsed in this period.

The Iron Gate is difficult to access, and, combined with a general lack of awareness of its architectural significance, this has meant that it is not a popular attraction. As a result, little is known about its historical condition, and much of the knowledge comes from studies conducted by modern independent academics. The site is owned by Turkey through the Ministry of Culture and Tourism and Monuments Council; in 2024, it was added to the Europa Nostra-backed 7 Most Endangered Programme.

After a large earthquake in 1872, the ancient ruins of Antioch were legally opened for looting so that their stone could be reused. The only parts of the city wall still remaining in 1939 were the parts on top of the Iron Gate dam, and above the adjacent gate. The latter section, systematically stripped of stone for building materials, soon collapsed, probably around 1980. The devastating 2023 earthquake further damaged the portion atop the Iron Gate. The remaining city wall structure may be at risk of collapse. The condition of the dam itself is also unknown, the opus caementicium concrete infill having deteriorated with age and increased exposure. Possible solutions include injecting the opus caementicium with chemicals to stabilise it, temporary protection of exposed areas to slow erosion, or even temporarily dismantling vulnerable parts of the structure to reduce the risk of a catastrophic total collapse.

Iron Gate hydrological measurements
Parmenios catchment area	9.4 square kilometres (3.6 mi^{2})
Original reservoir capacity	15,400 cubic metres (540,000 ft^{3})
Post-reconstruction reservoir capacity	21,400 cubic metres (760,000 ft^{3})
2008 reservoir capacity	17,000 cubic metres (600,000 ft^{3})
Original overflow discharge	6.5 cubic metres (230 ft^{3}) / second
Post-reconstruction overflow discharge	11 cubic metres (390 ft^{3}) / second
Original bottom outlet discharge	45 cubic metres (1,600 ft^{3}) / second
2008 bottom outlet discharge	19 cubic metres (670 ft^{3}) / second
Expected peak inflow	99 cubic metres (3,500 ft^{3}) / second

The integrity of the dam has been further compromised by recent changes intended to assist the structure. In an attempt to stop the rapid flow of sediment through the bottom outlet, which was slowly deteriorating that area of the structure, local engineers built a small retaining wall a few metres upstream of the dam. Although this has no doubt accomplished its objective of retaining sediment, it has had significant unintended consequences: the flow of water through the outlet has been more than halved to only 19 cubic metres (670 ft^{3}) / second (from its original peak of 45 cubic metres (1,600 ft^{3}) / second). As a result, not only has the erosion of the bottom outlet increased, but the outlet is increasingly blocked by debris. A major flood might cause severe erosion of the bottom outlet; it may also build up and overtop the dam, causing a flash flood that would cause severe damage to urban Antakya. In addition, the flow of water is much more turbulent: The additional dynamic forces caused by two consecutive ninety-degree turns generate vibrations throughout the entire structure.

Of particular importance to the study of the Iron Gate was an archaeological urban survey carried out between 2004 and 2009 as a collaboration between the German University of Halle-Wittenberg and the Leipzig University of Applied Sciences, funded by the Fritz Thyssen Foundation. It recorded the status of many hydrological and related buildings in Antioch, including the Gate. In addition, a site visit in February 2025 briefly surveyed the structure's integrity following the 2023 earthquake. Compared to Antakya, which suffered 25,000 deaths, 30,000 injured people, and 6,400 buildings destroyed including 70% of homes, the Iron Gate survived relatively intact; nevertheless, a detailed review of underlying weaknesses has not been done. Although the Iron Gate was designated a cultural property in 1993, with a protection zone around it, as of 2026 there are no preservation plans for the structure. Initial estimates of the cost of urgent work needed to avert any imminent danger of collapse amount to around US$1 million; the cost of more thorough stabilisation might reach US$5 million.
