= Antioch earthquake =

Antioch earthquake

- 115 Antioch earthquake
- 526 Antioch earthquake
- 528 Antioch earthquake
