= Maronite Chronicle =

Maronite Chronicle may refer to:

- Maronite Chronicle of 664, surviving in Syriac
- Maronite Chronicle of 713, surviving in Arabic
