= Siege of Antioch (1137–1138) =

- Part of the Komnenian Restoration and Byzantine–Norman wars
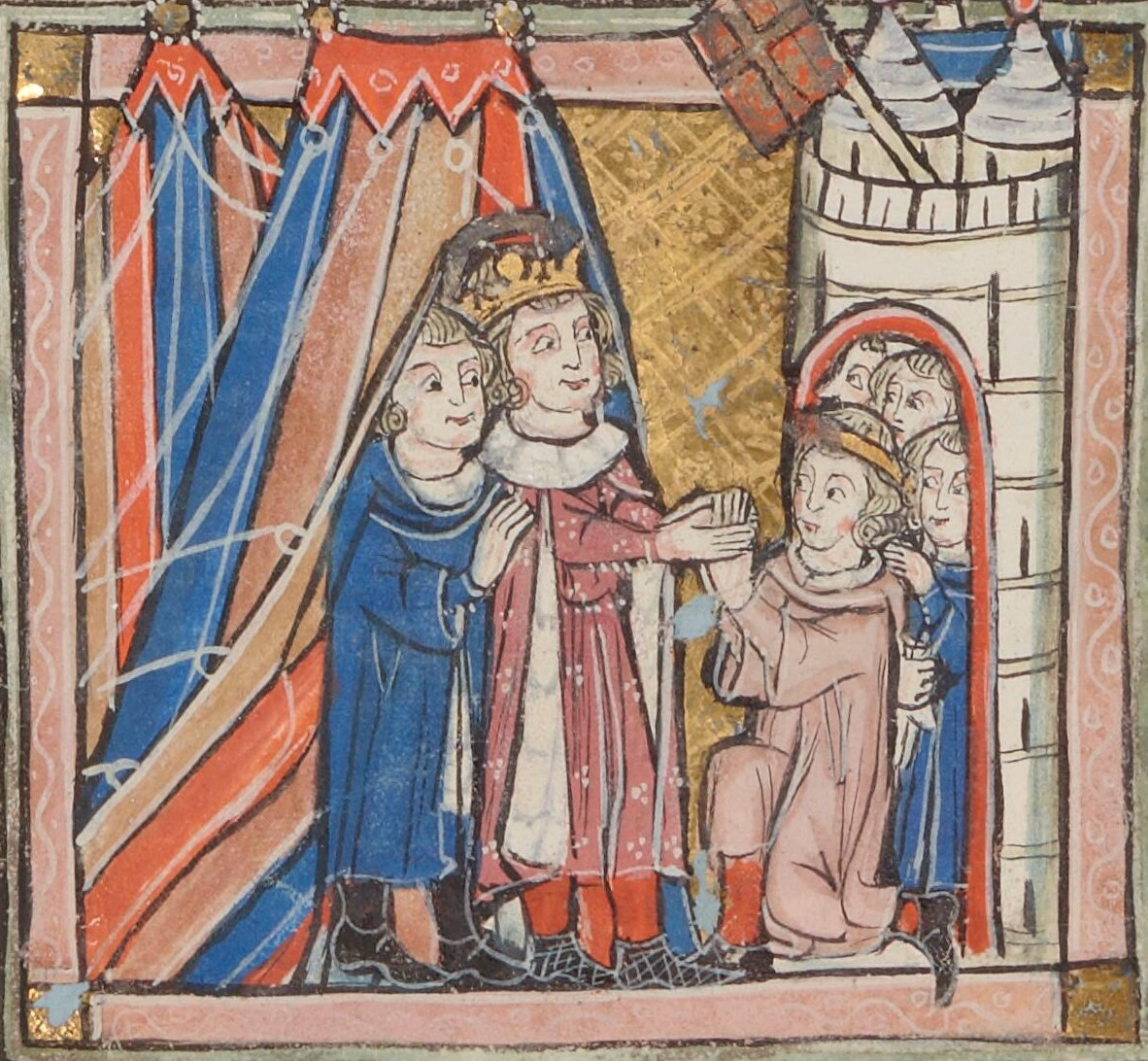
- 14th century manuscript depicting Raymond kneeling and swearing fealty to John II Komnenos
Date	August 1137–May 1138
Location	Antioch (modern-day Antakya, Turkey) and northern Syria
Result	Byzantine victory
Territorial changes	Establishment of nominal Byzantine suzerainty over the Principality of Antioch

Belligerents
Byzantine Empire	Principality of Antioch

Commanders and leaders
John II Komnenos; John Axouch; Alexios the Younger; Manuel Komnenos; Andronikos Komnenos	Raymond of Poitiers (surrendered); Ralph of Domfront (Note: Contemporary chronicler William of Tyre notes that Ralph was uniquely suited for a leadership role during the siege, describing him as a "military man, very magnificent and generous" who possessed a temperament better suited to martial affairs than ecclesiastical duties.)

Strength
20,000–25,000 Byzantine regulars	4,000–5,000 Latin knights and garrison infantry

Casualties and losses
Minimal	Minimal

The Siege of Antioch (1137–1138) was a diplomatic and military intervention conducted by the Byzantine Emperor John II Komnenos to reassert imperial sovereignty over the Crusader Principality of Antioch. Driven by the expansionist actions of Prince Raymond of Poitiers in Byzantine-claimed Cilicia, the operation resulted in the submission of the Latin principality, a conditional treaty of territorial exchange, and a subsequent joint campaign into Muslim-held Syria.

== Background ==
The Crusader states in 1135

Following his accession in 1136, the ambitious Prince Raymond of Poitiers sought to expand the borders of the Principality of Antioch. With the approval of King Fulk of Jerusalem, Raymond allied with Baldwin of Marash and launched an invasion of Armenian Cilicia, then ruled by Prince Levon I.

Although Levon and his ally, Count Joscelin II of Edessa, initially defeated Raymond in the field, Raymond later captured Levon through treachery. To secure his release, the Armenian prince promised to cede the strategic Cilician fortresses of Mamistra, Adana, and Savranda to Antioch. Levon also agreed to pay a substantial financial ransom and deliver his sons as hostages. However, upon his release, Levon immediately reneged on the treaty, and hostilities resumed until early 1137, when Joscelin brokered a temporary truce. Though a temporary peace between the Crusaders and Armenians was brokered, the internal conflict between the Crusader and Armenian states provided a geopolitical pretext for the Byzantine Emperor, John II Komnenos, to intervene.

From the perspective of Constantinople, both factions were contesting territory that legally belonged to the Byzantine Empire. To prevent Antioch from permanently absorbing Cilicia and achieving total regional autonomy, John mobilized a large imperial field army to reassert sovereignty over the frontier.

John directed a swift, methodical campaign against the Armenian principality. Utilizing advanced imperial siege artillery, the Byzantine forces systematically dismantled Armenian defences by capturing major urban centers, coastal ports, and rugged fortifications, including Tarsus, Adana, Mopsuestia, Anazarbus, Vahka (Feke Castle) and Gaban. This offensive effectively dissolved the independent Armenian state.

In the summer of 1137, John capitalized on his momentum by leading his army through the Taurus Mountains. The speed of the Byzantine advance caught the regional powers entirely by surprise. Driven by the strategic objective to curb the growing power of the Muslim Atabeg Zengi in neighboring Aleppo, John utilized his imperial claims as a casus belli to march directly onto Antioch. Caught outside the city walls during the surprise advance, Prince Raymond narrowly evaded capture, successfully retreating inside the fortifications with his bodyguards through the Iron Gate.

== Siege and Treaty of Antioch ==
By August 1137, the Byzantine forces arrived at the formidable walls of Antioch. John executed a textbook investment of the city. The imperial army established a tight perimeter, cutting off all land-based supply lines and communications, deploying heavy, state-of-the-art siege engines and trebuchets on the high ground overlooking the fortifications, unleashing a relentless bombardment on the defences. Raymond found himself in a hopeless tactical bottleneck, with his army severely depleted from the previous Cilician campaigns, the city's populace was panicking under the artillery barrage, and King Fulk of Jerusalem flatly refused to send a relief force, acknowledging that John was legally in his right to claim suzerainty.

Recognizing that the city walls would eventually breach, Raymond opened diplomatic channels and formally surrendered to the emperor. In a highly choreographed public ceremony of submission, Raymond rode out of the gates, knelt before John, and swore a solemn oath of fealty to the Byzantine Empire, while the imperial standard was hoisted over the citadel.

== Aftermath ==
The August 1137 submission of Antioch concluded with a conditional territorial exchange by surrendering Antioch, its citadel, and its coast to direct Byzantine administration. In return, John promised to conquer a contiguous network of inland cities, specifically Aleppo, Shaizar, Hama, and Homs, to form a new independent Crusader principality for Raymond. To implement this exchange and counter the rising power of Zengi, a unified Christian coalition of Byzantine, Antiochene, and Edessan forces marched into Muslim-held Syria in the spring of 1138. Bypassing the fortifications of Aleppo, the coalition captured the peripheral outposts at Atharib, Ma'arrat al-Numan, Kafarta and Bizaa.

The coalition eventually reached Shaizar and besieged it, however despite John’s efforts for the Christian cause, Raymond and Joscelin remained in their camps playing dice and feasting instead of assisting to press the siege. Nonetheless the walls of Shaizar were battered by the trebuchets of the Byzantine siege train, the city was taken, but the citadel defied assault. Eventually, the Emir of Shaizar, Sultan ibn Munqidh offered to become John's vassal by paying a large indemnity and a yearly tribute. At this point, with the advance of a relief army under Zengi with the poor coordination and behaviour of his allies, the emperor accepted the offer of the emir, lifting the siege.

== Bibliography ==
- Angold, Michael (1984). The Byzantine Empire, 1025–1204: A Political History. London, United Kingdom: Longman. ISBN 9780582294684. ISBN 0-582-49061-8
- Birkenmeier, John W. (2002). The Development of the Komnenian Army: 1081–1180. Leiden: Brill. ISBN 90-04-11710-5.
- Bucosssi, A. and Suarez, A.R. (eds.) (2016). John II Komnenos, Emperor of Byzantium: In the Shadow of Father and Son, Routledge, London and New York ISBN 978-1-4724-6024-0
- Harris, Jonathan (2014). Byzantium and the Crusades (2nd ed.). Bloomsbury Academic. ISBN 978-1780938318.
- Runciman, Steven (1952). A History of the Crusades, Volume II: The Kingdom of Jerusalem and the Frankish East, 1100-1187. Cambridge: Cambridge University Press – via Internet Archive.
