= Qais al-Marouni =

Qais al-Marouni (Arabic: قيس الماروني) was a medieval Maronite historian. The only source of Qais is from the Arab historian al-Masudi who wrote: "Among the followers of Maroun, the Maronites, there is one known as Qais al-Marouni, who has a fine book on history, the beginning of creation, the prophets, the scriptures, the cities, the nations, the kings of the Romans and others, and their accounts." Qais's book was said to have ended with the caliph Al-Muqtafi (r. 1136 AD – 1160 AD) meaning he likely lived around the end of the ninth century and beginning of the tenth century.

Although Qais' work is presumed to be lost, the French Catholic priest and scholar François Nau discovered fragments of a Syriac book written by a Maronite in the British Museum which he believed were part of Qais book. Theodor Nöldeke wrote about these excerpts as well and viewed them as highly important. Henri Lammens wrote a piece about Qais in Al-Machriq also connecting him to a Syriac manuscript.

== See also ==
- Maronite Chronicle of 664
