= On Buildings =

Contemporary work about Byzantine construction

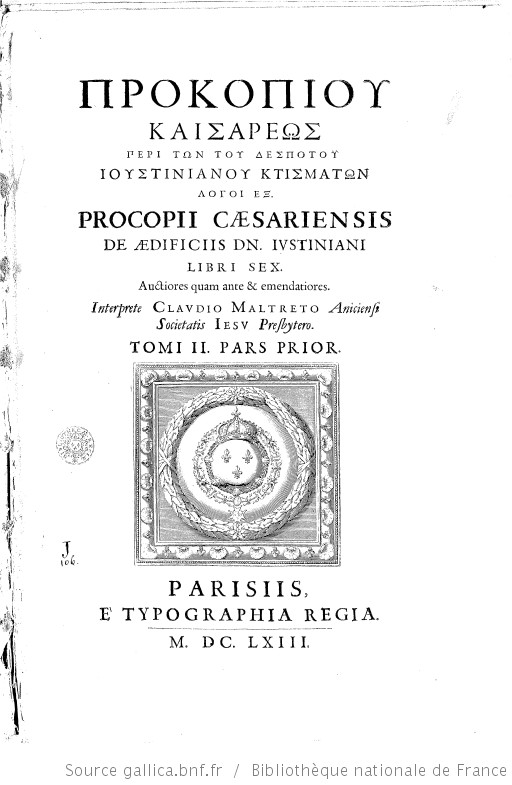
- 1663 edition
- Author: Procopius of Caesarea
- Language: Medieval Greek
- Genre: Panegyric
- Publication date: 550s

On Buildings (in Medieval Greek: Περὶ κτισμάτων, in Latin: De aedificiis) is a work by the Byzantine historian Procopius, dedicated to the construction projects of Emperor Justinian I (r. 527–565). On Buildings is a valuable compilation of information about construction activity around the Mediterranean region in the 6th century. Some cities mentioned in the work are known only from this text, and no other document has survived. It is believed that the work was commissioned or ordered by the reigning emperor to glorify his achievements.

The work is divided into six books of different length, each dedicated to Justinian's achievements across different parts of his vast Byzantine Empire. After a brief introduction, the text describes the capital, Constantinople, with the first book focusing primarily on its ecclesiastical architecture. The second book covers fortifications in Mesopotamia, while the third addresses those in Byzantine Armenia. The fourth book lists fortresses and other military structures on the Balkan Peninsula. The fifth book details buildings constructed or restored in Asia Minor and Palestine. The sixth book is devoted to Byzantine Egypt, Cyrenaica, Tripolitania, and other provinces of Byzantine North Africa.

== Procopius and His Works ==
The second half of the 6th century is considered one of the most significant periods in the history of the Byzantine Empire, preceding the 7th century's Dark Ages, and the Iconoclastic period of the 8th–9th centuries. This era marked important transformations in Byzantine society, the culmination of the fusion of classical and Christian cultures, and the transition from the ancient polis to the medieval city. The details of this process remain somewhat unclear. In many cases, the works of Procopius are the primary or even sole source for this period. The question of the authorship and dating of Procopius' works is crucial for evaluating events during the final years of the reign of Emperor Justinian I (r. 527–565). Many classical studies of Byzantine history concerning Justinian's reign, if not largely paraphrasing Procopius' History of the Wars (as in J. B. Bury's A History of the Later Roman Empire, 1923), rely on it as the primary source of factual material.

Little is known about Procopius' life beyond what he revealed in his works. By his own account, he was born in Caesarea in Palestine. In the 4th century, this city was a major center of Christian theology, home to an extensive library founded by Pamphilus. By the 6th century, Caesarea likely retained its cultural significance. It was a cosmopolitan city inhabited by Christians, Jews, and Samaritans, and Procopius may have been well-acquainted with the turbulent history of the region. This familiarity may explain his apparent disapproval of Justinian's policies aimed at suppressing religious minorities. (Note: Goth., I.III 6) According to Averil Cameron, few Christians of the time shared Procopius' view that investigating the nature of God was "folly and madness" or his condemnation of the persecution of theological opponents. This stance led some scholars, notably Felix Dahn, to suggest Procopius may have been of Jewish origin. Similarly, historian Kate Adshead, based on Procopius' tone regarding the Samaritans, proposed a Samaritan background. The prevailing view today is that Procopius belonged to the upper echelons of Caesarea's Christian society. (Note: In 2007, Warren Treadgold revived a theory proposed by J. Haury in 1891, suggesting that Procopius' father was a governor of Palaestina Prima with the same name, a native of Edessa, mentioned by Procopius in On Buildings.) He likely received a legal education. Based on his adoption of the historical style of Thucydides, some scholars infer that he studied in Gaza, known for its 6th-century scholarship on this ancient Greek historian, though no direct evidence supports this theory. Since 527, Procopius was a secretary and legal advisor (Latin: assessor) of the Belisarius general, accompanying him in all the wars conducted during Justinian's reign. His observations formed the basis for Books I–VII of History of the Wars, completed in 550, with the eighth book finished later, likely in 554. Belisarius' dismissal in 548 was a blow to Procopius. Around the same time as completing the initial books of History of the Wars, Procopius wrote his famous pamphlet, Secret History, exposing the vices and misdeeds of Justinian and his wife Theodora. Sometime in the 550s or early 560s, he produced a work of a markedly different tone, the panegyric On Buildings. With these three works, Procopius is the only author to have written a history, an invective, and a panegyric dedicated to the same individual.

The diversity of Procopius' works, presenting contrasting perspectives on Justinian's rule, has prompted extensive analysis. In 1865, German historian Felix Dahn proposed the first comprehensive theory, suggesting that a disillusioned patriot, Procopius wrote On Buildings under imperial orders, against his convictions, fearing reprisals. His true opinions, Dahn argued, were expressed later in the Secret History. Thus, the historian's worldview became closely tied to the dating of his works. In contrast, in 1985, British scholar Averil Cameron proposed viewing Procopius' triptych as a cohesive whole with shared themes and stylistic elements. Cameron's book Procopius and the Sixth Century spurred significant research in this area, resolving many questions. In 2004, the most recent major study on Procopius (as of 2016), by Anthony Kaldellis, revisited the question of how someone who risked writing the Secret History could portray Justinian as an exemplary Christian monarch. Kaldellis argued that On Buildings was insincere, written to avoid danger or for personal gain. The view of Procopius as primarily a dissident and a representative of Neoplatonic circles opposed to Justinian has been deemed unconvincing by most modern Byzantinists.

== Dating problems ==
=== Main Theories ===
Although it is generally accepted that the work was commissioned by the emperor, (Note: De aed., I.III 1) the specific circumstances are still unknown. The text does not explicitly indicate its creations' date, so historians attempt to date it by correlating statements in the treatise with events known from other sources. In 19th-century historiography, the prevailing view was that Procopius wrote On Buildings to regain the emperor's favor, which he had lost for unspecified reasons. This perspective was held by German historians Felix Dahn (1865) and Jacob Haury (1891). Haury suggested that Procopius was rewarded with the position of city prefect for his work, a claim now considered erroneous. English historian J. B. Bury also attributed the work's creation to Procopius' personal motives.

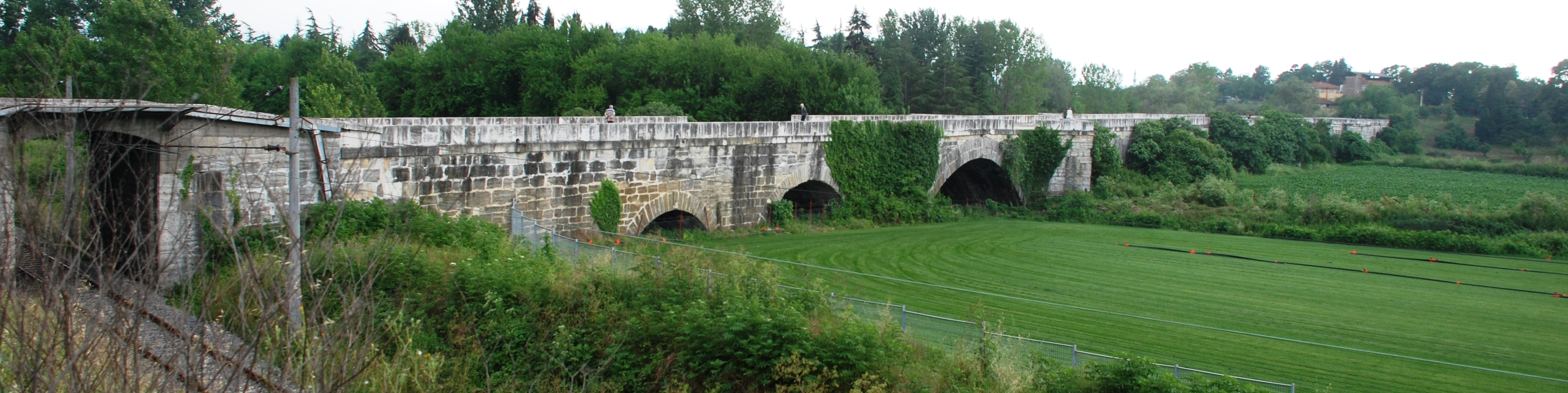
Bridge over the Sangarius River, modern condition.

In the late 19th century, Jacob Haury proposed that On Buildings was conceived by Procopius in 545 and completed in 560. This theory was later adopted by the renowned French Byzantinist Charles Diehl. American historian Glannville Downey (1947) argued that the work was unfinished in 559/560, when the bridge over the Sangarius River was under construction. During this period, in the final years of Justinian I's reign (r. 527–565), the empire faced a challenging phase. In 558, the Kutrigurs reached the walls of Constantinople, and in September 560, rumors of Justinian's death sparked unrest. In 562, a failed conspiracy against the emperor led to the dismissal of the general Belisarius, Procopius' patron. Earthquakes in August 553 and December 557 partially destroyed the empire's main cathedral, Hagia Sophia. Repairs began, but further damage from an earthquake in May 558 delayed restoration, which was completed only by late 562. In this context, Procopius' work, as a panegyric, aimed to highlight the architectural achievements of Justinian's waning reign. It was fitting that this task was entrusted to the foremost historian of the time, who had previously chronicled Justinian's victorious conquests in his History of the Wars. In 1949, German historian Ernst Stein argued against dating On Buildings after the Sangarius Bridge's construction, noting that Procopius did not mention the 558 collapse of Hagia Sophia's dome; described the Sanni tribe as a people submissive to the empire, (Note: De aed., III.VI 10) despite their rebellion in 557; and stated that Justinian converted most Samaritans to the true faith and made them Christians, (Note: De aed., V.VII 16) without referencing their revolt in July 555. Historian J. A. S. Evans (1969) countered that the latter two points are irrelevant, as they do not align with the work's genre or theme. However, Evans argued that the dome's collapse should have been included in the first book, and its absence suggests a date before May 7, 558. In 1983, Croke and Crow, without providing new arguments, dated the work to 554. Averil Cameron (1985) suggested that work on the treatise was interrupted around 554 due to the author's death. Michael Whitby rejects the idea that Procopius' death caused the work's incompletion, noting that publishing unfinished works was typical for Procopius. He ceased work on the Secret History in 551, three years before his presumed death, and published the History of the Wars in the same year, while conflicts in Lazica and Italy were ongoing. Regarding Italian constructions, whose absence is a key argument for the work's incompletion, Whitby notes that Justinian's building projects in Italy were limited, with famous basilicas in Ravenna funded by private individuals.

English historian Michael Whitby provided a thorough analysis of the dating debate as of 1985. He dismisses Stein's argument about Sanni tribe, as their 557 rebellion was not universal, with some remaining loyal to the empire, and it was suppressed the following year by troops led by a Tzani commander, Theodore. The Tzani lived peacefully within the empire for the next two decades, making the event unworthy of mention in a panegyric composed in 560 or 561. Similarly, Whitby views the 555 Samaritan revolt as a brief outburst of violence, triggered by an unexpected reconciliation with Jews. The unrest, confined to Caesarea, resembled a typical 6th-century hippodrome riot more than a full-scale national uprising. The disturbances likely subsided quickly without new legislative restrictions on Samaritans. As a native of Caesarea, Procopius was likely aware of the local context and the limited scale of the issue, unlike the events of 529. Thus, Whitby argues, the Samaritan revolt does not preclude a 560/561 dating. To address the Hagia Sophia dome collapse, Whitby proposes two solutions. One, suggested by Haury, is that the work was written over several years, with Book I completed before the 558 collapse and not revised afterward, while the remaining books were written two or three years later. Whitby considers Glannville Downey's theory of two editions of the work unlikely, suggesting it was not fully edited instead. Alternatively, Whitby posits that Procopius deliberately omitted the dome's collapse as inconsistent with the work's celebratory tone. He may have described the pre-collapse dome, which was more impressive than the restored version, or written in 560/561 when major repairs were complete, and the original lavish decorations were still in use. Whitby's own theory emphasizes Book V's statement that the emperor was currently building, and would soon complete, the bridge over the Sangarius River. Based on the poem by Paul the Silentiary and the chronicle of Theophanes the Confessor, the bridge's completion is dated to 562 or 563, leading Whitby to place the completion of On Buildings in 560/561. This dating, he argues, offers a more consistent view of Procopius' evolving worldview after the Secret History (551) and Book VIII of the History of the Wars (553).

Nevertheless, Whitby's arguments did not shift the scholarly consensus, which favors a dating of On Buildings around 554. Canadian historian Geoffrey Greatrex, in a 1994 analysis of the dating issues surrounding Procopius' works, found no compelling evidence for a later date. Greatrex highlighted the significance of Procopius' references to the Anastasian Wall in Thrace. This defensive structure, built under Emperor Anastasius I, failed to repel barbarian invasions in 540 and 559. Greatrex noted that Procopius' tone suggests no such failures occurred recently, which is incompatible with a later dating of On Buildings. He also corroborated Ernst Stein's view that Theophanes the Confessor's information about the Sangarius Bridge is unreliable. However, in 1996, J. A. S. Evans, after reviewing all existing theories, found no reason to abandon his earlier support for a later dating. Additional arguments for a later dating were provided by Denis Roques, the author of a French translation, in 2011. A detailed comparison of two editions of On Buildings was conducted by F. Montinaro, who suggested that the first was written in 550/551 and the second around 554. Consequently, in 2013, Greatrex, after another review of the arguments, concluded that the dating of On Buildings remains far from resolved.

=== Connection with other works ===
Scholars have identified textual connections between On Buildings and Procopius' other works, which inform hypotheses about its dating. It is possible that Procopius planned On Buildings while working on his pamphlet, Secret History (Anecdota), whose dating is also complex. German historians Otto Veh and Berthold Rubin identified three references in On Buildings to the Secret History and History of the Wars (Bell., Books I–VII). One is the description of the siege of Edessa by the Sasanian army. Procopius links this event to a legendary letter from Jesus Christ to King Abgar V, promising the city eternal protection from barbarians. After a lacuna of indeterminate length, Procopius writes, "…he strives to apply this to himself, judging by what happened in my time and what I will discuss in subsequent books". (Note: Bell., II.XII 29) According to Michael Whitby, there is no basis for linking this to the account of a flood in Edessa in On Buildings.

A second textual connection may be Procopius' promise in the Secret History to later address the mitigation of a flood of the Skirtos River in Edessa. (Note: Anec., XVIII 38) He revisits this topic in Book II of On Buildings, (Note: De aed., II.VII 2-16) though possibly also in Book II of his Persian Wars. According to historian J. A. S. Evans, this potential link between the panegyric and the pamphlet suggests further insights into Procopius' worldview, as he was compelled to conceal his true feelings about events. The challenge is that the state of the Secret History text allows for references to either future or prior works. Whitby, advocating a later dating of On Buildings, supports a conjectural reading in the future tense (as in A. Chekalova's Russian translation). Conversely, Otto Veh and Berthold Rubin suggest a reference to the History of the Wars, although no account of the Skirtos flood appears in the surviving text, it may have been in a lacuna.

The third connection is less certain. In the Secret History, while discussing demonic fasting habits of Justinian (see #Attitude toward Justinian), Procopius notes that he had already written about this.

== Style and Method ==
=== Genre and antecedents ===
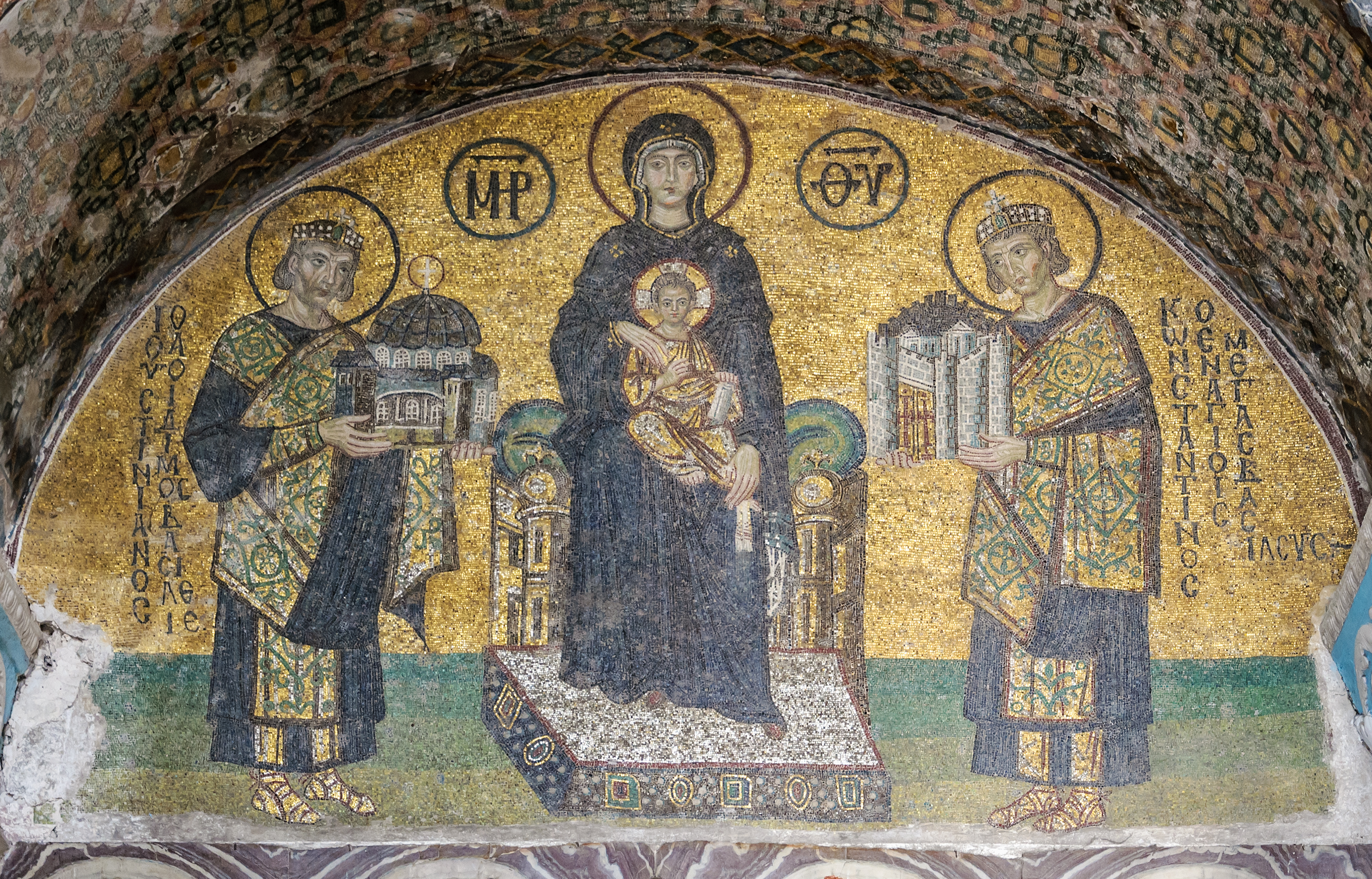
Justinian (left) presenting the Hagia Sophia in Constantinople to the Virgin Mary and Jesus. Mosaic from the Hagia Sophia.

Although the work is generally classified as a panegyric, (Note: The genre of On Buildings was first identified as such by Felix Dahn in 1865.) many scholars note that its effectiveness as a panegyric is diminished by its evident incompleteness. No official panegyric was produced during Justinian I's reign, prompting scholars to seek analogies in other works that laud specific achievements of his rule. One of Justinian's greatest accomplishments was the construction of the Hagia Sophia, discussed in the first book of On Buildings. (Note: De aed., I.I 21-78) The cathedral was restored and reconsecrated in 537, its dome collapsed in 558, and it was reconsecrated on Christmas 562/563. Three other works are associated with these events. The earliest is the kontakion On Earthquakes and Fires by Romanos the Melodist, written shortly after the cathedral's destruction during the Nika riots of 532. Like Procopius two decades later, Romanos attributes the uprising not to rebellion against the emperor but against God. For Romanos, the Hagia Sophia symbolizes the imperial throne and authority, which may explain why Procopius begins his treatise with it. An anonymous kontakion on the second reconsecration adopts a more religious perspective, portraying the cathedral as belonging to God rather than the emperor. Justinian is mentioned only once, compared to Bezalel, the builder of Moses' Tabernacle. Key achievements of the era—expelling barbarians and overcoming heresies—are attributed to Christ, not Justinian. Like Procopius, the kontakion's author omits the dome's collapse, emphasizing the reliability of the restored structure. The third work, an ekphrasis by Paul the Silentiary, was commissioned by the emperor. It links Justinian and God from the outset, reinforcing that opposing the emperor equates to opposing God and that Justinian was divinely protected. The panegyric credits Christ-guided achievements, including calm harbors, control of rivers (notably the Sangarius), expansion across oceans, and the defeat of usurpers. The 558 dome collapse is mentioned but framed as past sorrow overshadowed by present joy. Scholars identify numerous similarities between Procopius' and Paul's descriptions, indicating a shared rhetorical tradition. Compared to these three panegyrics, Procopius' account is more centred in Justinian.

According to Jaś Elsner, in On Buildings, Procopius continues a tradition, dating back to the Principate and antiquity, of associating emperors with their constructions. The stylistic diversity of Procopius' works—encompassing panegyric, pamphlet, and history—recalls the genre-switching of Second Sophistic authors like Lucian and Philostratus, whose surviving works rarely share the same genre. Similar genre blending appears in Arrian's Periplus of the Euxine Sea, which combines a geographical survey, a private letter to Emperor Hadrian, and elements of an encomium. Likewise, Philostratus' Life of Apollonius of Tyana merges fiction, biography, and hagiography. In at least the first book of On Buildings, Procopius demonstrates familiarity with classical works by Homer, Pindar, and Xenophon, as well as narratives about Themistocles and Cyrus the Great. As a work in the city praise genre, On Buildings follows a tradition exemplified by Pericles' funeral oration and other Ancient Greek examples. (Note: On this genre, see:) Such praise was typically tied to specific events, like local festivals or imperial visits. Praises of individual structures were also common. Closer to Procopius' time, this genre is evident in the works of Libanius, who praised Antioch, and Himerius, who honored Constantinople. Traces of this genre, shared with Procopius' work, appear in the writings of church historian Eusebius of Caesarea and Ammianus Marcellinus. For the reign of Justinian's predecessor, Anastasius I (491–518), similar panegyrics are known from Procopius of Gaza and Priscian of Caesarea.

Jaś Elsner places Procopius' description of the Hagia Sophia's magnificent decoration within the tradition of praising individual artworks, traceable to Homer's description of Achilles' shield in the Iliad. This technique, known as ekphrasis, includes later examples like the description of buildings by Apollodorus of Damascus, who constructed Trajan's Bridge over the Danube under Emperor Trajan. Procopius' use of this method underscores the superiority of Justinian's buildings and monumental artworks over earlier ones. Another genre related to Procopius' work is the periegesis, a type of guidebook, exemplified by Pausanias' Description of Greece. In this genre, buildings are treated as landmarks and organized thematically to highlight a region's distinctiveness. For Procopius, the entire Byzantine Empire becomes such a "region" in relation to Justinian. Elements of other epideictic rhetorical genres, as outlined by the 3rd-century rhetorician Menander, are also evident in On Buildings.

Thus, the general assessment of On Buildings as a panegyric persists, with ongoing debate about its place among Procopius' works and Byzantine literature as a whole.

=== Procopius' Descriptive Method ===
The primary stylistic and methodical hallmark of the work is the remarkable variety of information provided. Procopuis furthers an extensive list of fortifications and churches with detailed classification of the structures. Amongst his catalogue of military structures Procpius identifies fortresses, bastions, walls, small forts, and towers; religious buildings are designated as sanctuaries, martyria, temples, and cathedrals; while close attention its given to the specificities of water-related structures - i.e., bridges, cisterns, reservoirs, aqueducts, dams, and dikes. Procopius describes the construction of ports, granaries, hospices, hospitals, fountains, streets, and commercial spaces by Justinian I, circumscribing both typical and unique structures such as the equestrian statue of Justinian on a dedicated column in Constantinople.

Following the Hellenistic tradition for the dicsussion of distant regions, Procopius includes geographical, ethnographic or historic details and references; the latter pertaining to both the distant past - such as 3rd–4th century Armenia (Note: De aed., III.I 4-15, 24-29) - or more recent historical events, namely the Persian shah Kavadh I's campaign against Byzantium in 502. He discusses the history of the Samaritans in the 5th–6th centuries, the histories of Ptolemais and Leptis Magna, the Christianization of the Tzani in the Caucasus and Berbers in Cyrenaica, the insignia of Armenian satraps, (Note: De aed., III.I 18-23) and navigation features in the Lesser Syrtis. (Note: De aed., VI.IV 15-23)

Procopius' method of describing Justinian's achievements on the eastern frontier, exemplified by his account of the restoration of Antioch, (Note: De aed., II.X 2-14) was analyzed by Glannville Downey (1939). Downey notes that Procopius omits the devastating earthquakes of 526, 528, 554, and 557, focusing instead on restoration efforts following the Persian destruction of Antioch in 540, which provided more material for a panegyric. He exaggerates the Persian-inflicted damage and fails to mention that the city's walls remained intact. Such omissions are characteristic of Book II. For instance, Procopius describes Batnae as lacking walls, (Note: De aed., II.VII 18) despite Joshua the Stylite indicating their existence in 504, when the city was captured by Persians, (Note: Joshua the Stylite, Chronicle, LXIII) and their restoration under Anastasius I. Similarly, in Book I, Procopius attributes to Justinian the construction of the Church of Sts. Peter and Paul, built in 519, and the creation of a harbor in Chalcedon, constructed in the late 5th century.

Another technique Procopius employs, also seen in the Secret History, is dating Justinian's reign from the accession of his uncle and predecessor, Justin I (518–527). For example, the restoration of Edessa's walls after the 525 flood, known from John Malalas to have occurred under Justin, is credited to Justinian. Joshua the Stylite's testimony also contradicts Procopius' claim that "the fortress wall of Edessa and its outer defenses had mostly fallen into ruin due to age". Another example is the account of Melitene's walls. (Note: De aed., III.IV 19-20) In some cases, Procopius likely downplays the significance of cities in prior reigns to exaggerate Justinian's contributions, as seen when comparing his claims to other sources. For instance, he describes the walls of Constantina as dilapidated and inadequate, (Note: De aed., II.V 2) despite its role as the residence of the dux of Mesopotamia and its withstanding a Persian siege in 501/502. Similarly, his account of Circesium, another dux residence in Osroene, is questionable. References to dilapidated walls are a recurring motif in Procopius' work.

Thus, Procopius' data cannot be the sole source for dating the construction of specific structures. Moreover, care must be taken to avoid circular reasoning, where attributing one structure to Justinian's era leads to similar assumptions for others of the same type.

=== Opinion about Justinian ===
For a long time, Byzantine historiography viewed Procopius' work critically. French Byzantinist Charles Diehl in 1901 described it as little more than a list of Justinian-era constructions and "the most unqualified and flattest panegyric". Its significance was considered in the context of the historian's worldview, as reconciling it with the sharply contrasting tone of the Secret History proved challenging. While J. B. Bury, following Edward Gibbon, attributed Procopius' lavish praise to veiled irony, Diehl found the flattery excessive. In 1971, Soviet historian Zinaida Udaltsova characterized Procopius' works, particularly On Buildings, as a "6th-century ethno-geographic encyclopedia" containing information that "withstood the strictest scrutiny for accuracy". Nonetheless, she described its tone as excessively laudatory. In 1998, American historian Philip Rousseau revisited Procopius' tone toward Justinian, finding his epithets so hyperbolic that On Buildings could be considered as insulting as the Secret History.

In contrast to the Secret History, where Justinian is depicted as a demon, in On Buildings, Procopius portrays him as close to God, following the established tradition of presenting a Christian ruler as God's earthly representative, a near-superhuman figure. Religious fasting, portrayed as a demonic trait in the Secret History (as Justinian allegedly spent time not eating to harm Romans and destroy the state), (Note: Anec., XII.28-32) becomes a mark of sanctity in On Buildings. Procopius recounts a miraculous cure of Justinian's rheumatism, caused by mortification of the flesh, through the sudden flow of holy oil from the relics of the Forty Martyrs discovered during the construction of the Church of St. Irene. (Note: De aed., I.VII) In another instance, the gravely ill emperor was saved by a vision of Saints Cosmas and Damian, in whose honor he later built a church. (Note: De aed., I.VI 5) During the construction of the Church of the Holy Apostles, the relics of Apostles Andrew, Luke, and Timothy were discovered, and their veneration by Justinian earned divine favor. (Note: De aed., I.IV 20-24) The emperor's piety is further emphasized by the enumeration of ecclesiastical buildings, their "innumerability" evoking the Res Gestae Divi Augusti for educated readers, which concludes with the same term. Divine assistance also aided Justinian's secular endeavors, such as the flood protection system built for Dara. (Note: De aed., II.III 1-23) The narrative's shift from ecclesiastical constructions in the capital in Book I to military fortifications on the eastern frontier in Book II underscores the emperor's role as protector of the Christian world. Book II also highlights his mastery over natural forces, such as controlling floods. In Book V, divine intervention reappears with the miraculous discovery of a suitable stone quarry near Jerusalem for the New Church, overcoming construction challenges.

According to Averil Cameron, Procopius' spiritual and secular perspectives on Justinian's activities are complementary, emphasizing the emperor's unique position. There is no basis for assuming that On Buildings does not reflect the author's views simply because they differ from those in other works. Jaś Elsner sees Justinian's building program, as described by Procopius, as "taming pagan or barbarian nature by infusing it with Christian culture" and an "icon" and model for future emperors.

=== Worldview aspects ===
A key aspect of the work's composition is its expressed attitude toward Christianity, which is presented consistently and less skeptically than in parts of the History of the Wars. This is unsurprising for a work commissioned by the emperor. From the outset, Procopius leans toward a religious interpretation of events. In Book I, he describes the Nika riots, stating, "not only against the emperor but in their lawlessness they raised their hands against God, daring to burn the Christian church." (Note: De aed., I.I 21) This contrasts with the secular account in the History of the Wars, which attributes responsibility to the chariot racing factions, and the Secret History, which points to senatorial opposition. Here, Procopius aligns with the chronicle of John Malalas, considered a highly official source. Differences in assessing the same phenomena between the Secret History and On Buildings are common. For instance, in the Secret History, prostitutes were forcibly confined to the "Monastery of Repentance," leading some to throw themselves into the sea, (Note: Anec., XVII.5) while in On Buildings, the institution founded by Justinian and Theodora enabled former prostitutes to "engage in pious deeds and service to God". (Note: De aed., I.XI 8) Procopius consistently adopts a Christian perspective, attributing the resolution of engineering challenges in reconstructing Dara to Justinian's piety rather than the skill of architects Anthemius of Tralles and Isidore of Miletus. In Book V, discussing the miraculous discovery of a marble quarry, he states, "we, measuring everything by human strength, consider much to be impossible, but for God, nothing is impossible or unachievable." (Note: De aed., V.VI 19) He also presents a Christian perspective on the conflict with Samaritans who desecrated an altar under Emperor Zeno, citing the Gospel of John. In the Secret History, he references the same events, shifting the emphasis to suggest it is foolish to suffer for "meaningless doctrine" and better to formally convert to Christianity. (Note: Anec., XI.25) Procopius' superficial familiarity with Christian terminology is evident. For instance, he explains the epithet of John the Theologian as due to his superior exposition of divinity compared to human nature's duality. (Note: De aed., V.I 5) Yet, mentioning Saint Anne, "whom some consider the mother of the Virgin Mary and nurse of Christ," he shows familiarity with Christian apocrypha, at least the Protoevangelium of James.

Overall, On Buildings provides limited insight into Procopius' personal religious views. While the History of the Wars is valuable for comparing pagan and Christian motifs and understanding concepts like Tyche, On Buildings is less informative in this regard.

== Content ==
One of the key issues in studying Late Antiquity is the continuity of urban life. Significant attention is devoted to examining the transformation of the ancient city into the medieval city. Since the second half of the 20th century, extensive archaeological research has been conducted in this area. A valuable complement to these studies is the comparison of archaeological data with written sources, and in this regard, Procopius' treatise On Buildings is a crucial and unique source. On Buildings is a repository of invaluable information about construction activities in the Mediterranean region during the 6th century. Some cities mentioned in the treatise are known only from this text. No other document of this kind has survived.

Although the work's importance as a source for archaeological studies has always been recognized, and as early as 1972, James Evans called On Buildings a source "providing a full and remarkably accurate account of Justinian's building program," only recently has it undergone critical scrutiny. Modern researchers have identified numerous inaccuracies, particularly in attributing construction projects to Justinian I that were actually carried out under Justin I or even Anastasius I. Additionally, there are unexplained and surprising omissions.

=== Structure of the Work ===
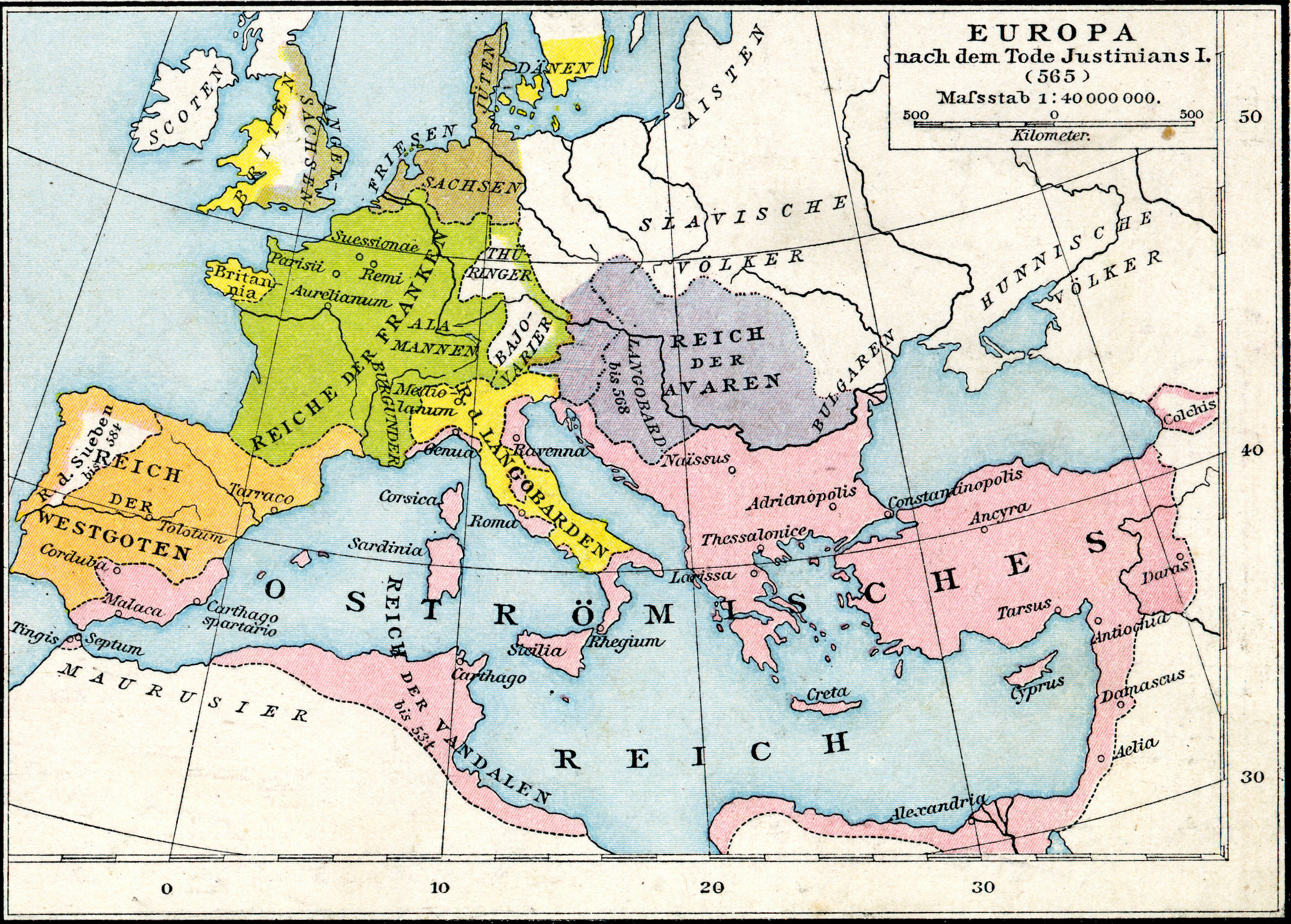
The Byzantine Empire in 565.

The treatise, consisting of six books, begins with a rhetorical introduction, a captatio benevolentiae. The author first emphasizes the importance of historical science, then praises Emperor Justinian I, ranking him above ancient rulers Themistocles and Cyrus II; Procopius also portrays the emperor as a conqueror and legislator. The substantive content starts with a description of the empire's capital, Constantinople, with Book I primarily devoted to its ecclesiastical buildings. Book II covers fortifications in Mesopotamia, while Book III addresses those in Armenia. Book IV lists fortresses and other military structures on the Balkan Peninsula. In Book V, the author discusses constructed and restored buildings in Asia Minor and Palestine. Book VI is dedicated to Egypt, Cyrenaica, Tripolitania, and other provinces of Byzantine Africa. The narrative in each book revolves around the main cities of the respective region: Constantinople (I), Dara (II), Martyrdom and Theodosiopolis (III), Justiniana Prima (IV), Jerusalem (V), and Leptis Magna (VI). This organizational structure aligns with the traditional scheme used by ancient geographers — such as Hecataeus, Pseudo-Scylax, Strabo, and others—progressing from east to west and north to south.

According to Glannville Downey's 1947 opinion, the work, as it has come down to us, is incomplete. This is evidenced by the absence of any discussion of buildings in Italy, despite Procopius mentioning its conquest. (Note: De aed., I.X, 16, II.X 2) Downey suggests that the composition of the later books further indicates incompleteness: Procopius' promise at the start of Book V to discuss "the rest of Asia and Libya" (Note: De aed., V.I 3) is fulfilled only in Book VI. Downey concludes that Book VI was originally part of Book V, supported by the brevity of these books, which together match the length of Books I, II, and IV. Additionally, unlike the other books, Book VI lacks references to the preceding book and does not begin with a brief note on the region's significance. The degree of the work's completion can also be assessed by analyzing its editorial thoroughness. Downey examined three lengthy lists of buildings (in sections IV.IV, IV.XI, and V.IX). He suggests the first two were based on government archives to which Procopius had access, while the third may have relied on an official source or the author's personal notes. The first list is more carefully crafted, clearly distinguishing between newly built and restored fortifications. The second list lacks this distinction, possibly reflecting differences in source quality. However, one would expect the author to eliminate duplicates and barbarisms during editing, standardizing fortress names to match official Greek documents. Yet, the second list contains three geographical names likely referring to the same place. The third list, dedicated to Phoenicia, includes entries related to Syria, indicating a lack of thorough editing. The near-identical repetition of text about the walls of Chalcis (Note: De aed., II.XI.1 and II.XI.8) may be a scribal error, as suggested by text editor Jacob Haury, or refer to two distinct cities with similar names (Chalcis ad Belum in Syria and Chalcis in Lebanon, near modern Majdal Anjar), or it may reflect incomplete editorial work, with Procopius undecided on the placement of the Chalcis walls reference. The second option is less likely, as the Lebanese Chalcis had been obscure for centuries, while a 550 inscription confirms the rebuilding of the Syrian Chalcis' walls.

In 1985, Averil Cameron concurred with the view that the work is incomplete. She notes not only the absence of information about Italy but also a qualitative shift in Books IV and V, which consist largely of lists. She rejects the hypothesis of German historian Berthold Rubin (1954), who argued that the omission of Italy was due to its limited contribution to the glory of Belisarius — Cameron argues the work was addressed directly to the emperor and aimed to glorify Justinian I's achievements.

=== Book I: Constantinople ===
Book I of On Buildings focuses primarily on the ecclesiastical constructions of Constantinople. Historians consider it the most literarily polished. In it, Justinian I is presented as the model Christian ruler, adorning his capital with magnificent structures. In this context, the book is a primary focus for studying whether the work as a whole is a panegyric. Modern scholars examine the text of Book I from various perspectives. The significance of the history of the Hagia Sophia for dating the work is discussed above. The use of certain words by Procopius and the nuances of their meanings have also been studied, with researchers seeking evidence of hidden irony or indications of Procopius' true attitude toward the emperor.

Several artistic images used by Procopius in this book have drawn scholarly attention. For instance, describing the famous equestrian statue of the emperor atop the Column of Justinian, Procopius writes that it is "clad in armor, as in heroic times; his head is covered with a helmet that seems to move: such a radiance, as if lightning, emanates from him. If one were to speak in poetic terms, it shines like an autumn star." (Note: De aed., I.II 9-10) Given the earlier mention of Achilles and the fact that, for a classically educated 6th-century reader, a poetic allusion typically referred to Homer, this likely points to a passage in the Iliad where the hero is compared to a star "that rises in autumn with fiery rays." However, that star is an ominous portent, "bringing evil pestilence to wretched mortals". (Note: Homer, Iliad, XXII, 27-31) In the same book, Procopius compares Justinian to two notable ancient rulers, Themistocles and Cyrus the Great. According to Plutarch, Themistocles was of obscure and barbarian origin, while Cyrus led Persia, a state historically hostile to classical civilization. These themes—Justinian's questionable origins and hostility to the Roman state—are central to the Secret History. Thus, according to Anthony Kaldellis, On Buildings reveals a subtle opposition in the author's stance.

=== Book II: Mesopotamia ===
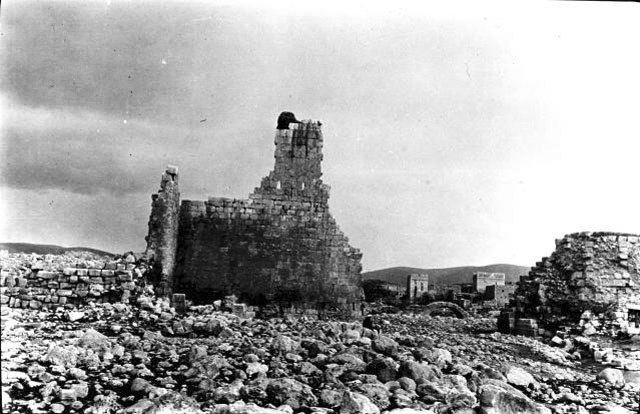
Southern water gates of Dara with tower remains. Photograph taken by Gertrude Bell in 1911.

A significant portion of Book II of On Buildings is devoted to Justinian's efforts in developing the fortress of Dara. Built on the site of a small village after the unsuccessful Persian war of 502–506, Dara served as a base for future operations against the Sasanian Empire. With reliable water sources and a strategic location, the fortress had advantages over the older Amida. Initial fortifications were constructed in 505–507 under Emperor Anastasius I, who named the city after himself and made it the residence of the dux of Mesopotamia. Subsequent events confirmed the site's suitability and the fortifications' reliability. Dara withstood a siege during the first of Justinian's wars with Persia, followed by Belisarius's victory over the Persians in 530. During the next war (539–544), when Antioch fell in 540, only Dara resisted a Persian siege. The fortress was renovated under Justinian but fell in 573. Due to its significance, Dara's history is documented in numerous sources, including eyewitness accounts in Procopius' History of the Wars, as well as works by Joshua the Stylite, Zacharias Rhetor, John Malalas, and others. In On Buildings, Procopius' account of Dara is highly detailed, second only to his description of Constantinople. It likely serves as a model for describing Justinian's achievements in securing the empire. The narrative structure is typical of the work: a brief history of the fortress's establishment, followed by descriptions of its fortifications, water supply, public buildings, and churches.

Verification of Procopius' claims about Dara has been conducted through comparisons with other sources and archaeological data. His assertions that Justinian built barracks and two churches ("the great church" and one dedicated to Bartholomew the Apostle) (Note: De aed., II.III 26) are questionable, as it is surprising that barracks were not built earlier given the fortress's military importance, and other sources indicate the churches were constructed under Anastasius. Procopius' account of the fortress's walls is also dubious. He claims the walls inherited by Justinian were too low and insufficient for defense, with many towers heavily damaged, contradicting Joshua the Stylite's testimony that the fortress withstood a Persian siege soon after its construction. Moreover, in his own account of the 530 events in the History of the Wars, Procopius gives no indication that Dara's walls were unreliable. He describes Justinian's improvements to the walls as follows: "Above them, he built a wall thirty feet high along the entire circuit; in thickness, he did not make it full size, fearing that excessive weight would irreparably harm the structure if the foundation were overburdened: he surrounded this level with a stone structure, built a gallery around the entire wall, and above the gallery erected battlements, so the wall had two levels throughout, and in the towers, there were even three places from which defenders repelled attackers." (Note: De aed., II.I 16) Procopius did not revisit these areas, and his account of the 540 siege in the Persian War relies on secondhand information, stating that "the city was surrounded by two walls, the inner one being of great size and truly remarkable (each tower rose to a hundred feet, and the rest of the wall was sixty feet high; the outer wall was much smaller but still strong and impressive)." (Note: Bell., II.XIII 16) Thus, these improvements were made in the 530s.

Since the Arab conquest, the fortress fell into ruin, with only a small village remaining, rarely visited by European researchers. The fortifications gradually deteriorated and are now in worse condition than when photographed by English traveler Gertrude Bell in 1911. In 1983, Brian Croke and James Crow analyzed the ruins' condition based on field research, identifying remains of several towers and water gates with two types of masonry: Type A, made of higher-quality stone, and Type B, likely from repair work. They proposed two phases of fortification construction, attributed to the reigns of Anastasius I and Justinian I, respectively, in the absence of additional archaeological or epigraphic evidence. While the poor state of the fortifications makes some of Procopius' claims unverifiable, researchers identified instances of inaccurate descriptions, exaggeration of Justinian's achievements, and omission of Anastasius' contributions, such as the massive "Hercules Tower," which dominated the fortress even in 573. Historians also analyzed Procopius' claims about Dara's water supply improvements, linked to the discovery of an underground river that suddenly appeared and damaged parts of the wall. Written evidence suggests this river was known in Dara during Anastasius' reign, and observations do not support Procopius' account.

=== Book III: Armenia and Crimea ===
In Book III, describing Justinian's achievements in Crimea, Procopius mentions four locations (Chersonesus, Bosporus, Alusta, and Gorzubitae) and a Gothic region called Dory. (Note: De aed., III.VII 10-17) Scholars of early medieval Crimea have repeatedly addressed the localization of Dory, attempting to pinpoint its location based on Procopius' brief references. Various theories exist, but the prevailing view places Dory in southwestern Crimea, in the Crimean highlands, around Mangup and its environs, covering a significant area. Later, this region became the Principality of Theodoro and, ecclesiastically, the Gothic Diocese. The mention of the so-called "long walls" is crucial for determining the Gothic territory: "Since their region seemed easily accessible to enemy attacks, the emperor fortified all entry points with long walls, thus relieving the Goths of fear of invasion". (Note: De aed., III.VII 17) Research conducted in the 1950s by the Institute of Archaeology of the National Academy of Sciences of Ukraine was not completed, leaving the issue unresolved. The question of whom these walls protected the Goths from remains unanswered, possibly descendants of the Tauri, pushed to the northern peninsula. Opinions vary on the reliability of this information. Procopius likely deserves trust only in the sense that his reports lack fabricated details or deliberate falsifications. However, due to his limited knowledge, his information is imprecise. He likely had poor familiarity with the northern and eastern Black Sea coasts, and his description of Dory's customs resembles a passage from Tacitus' Germania.

=== Book IV: Balkans and Greece ===
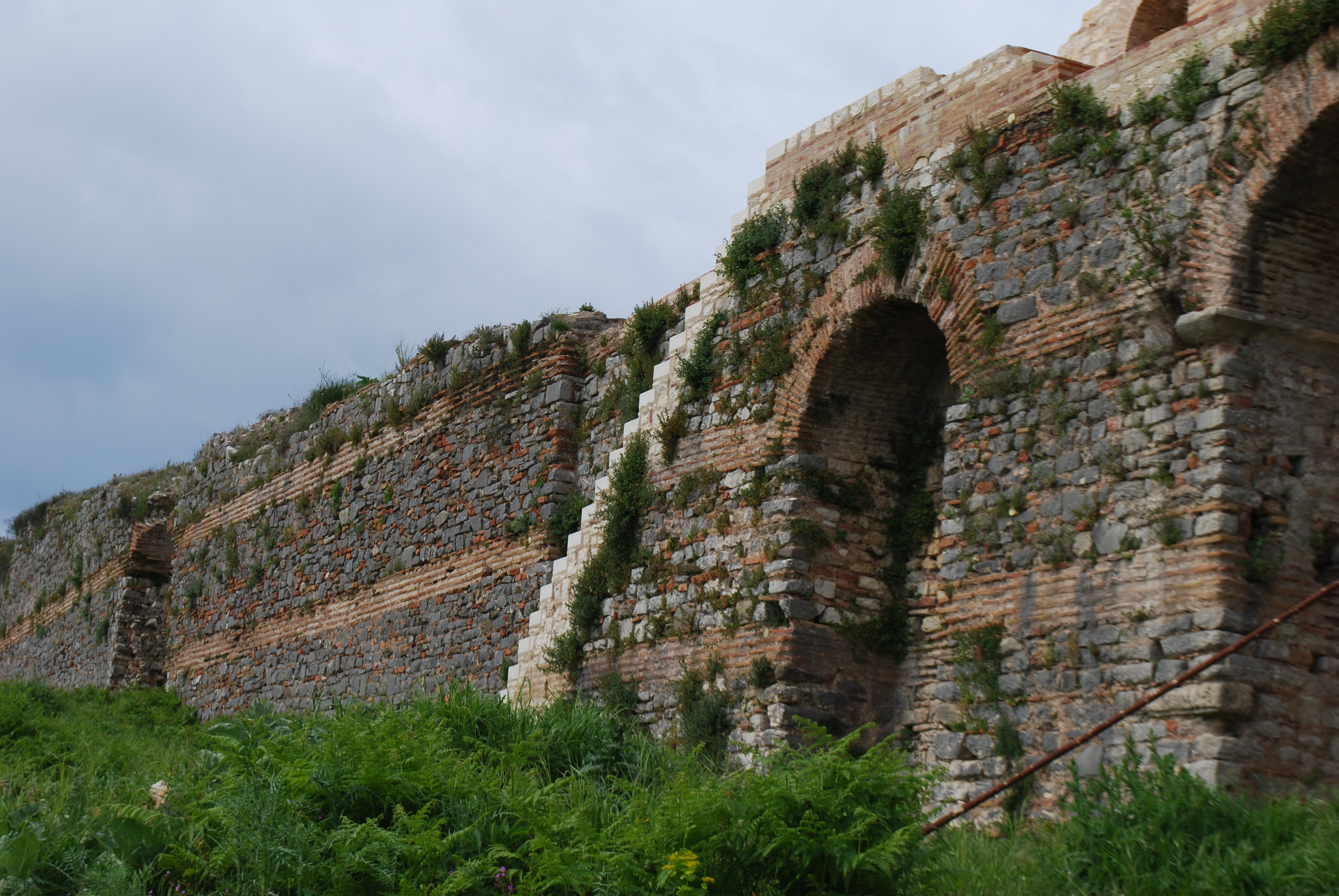
Significant fortifications from Justinian's time survive in Nicopolis. However, they are not mentioned by Procopius and may have been built in earlier reigns.

In Book IV, dedicated to Justinian I's activities in the Balkans, Procopius lists over 600 locations where fortifications were built or restored, though only a small portion has been reliably identified. According to Edward Gibbon, "they mostly consisted of stone or brick towers rising within a square or circular area, surrounded by a wall or moat, serving as refuges for peasants and livestock from nearby villages during emergencies". Gibbon's assessment is considered broadly accurate due to limited archaeological evidence. Excavations by Bulgarian archaeologists, starting with Ivan Velkov in the 1930s, have prompted a reassessment, revealing fortresses in large villages like Sadovsko Kale. Procopius' account of Justinian's activities in Greece, part of Book IV, is not very detailed. He begins with Thrace, mentioning in Epirus the rebuilding of Nicopolis, the restoration of Photice and Phoinike, and the construction of an unnamed city to which the inhabitants of Euroea were relocated (Note: De aed., IV.I 37-42); this city is typically identified as Ioannina. After Epirus, Procopius moves to Aetolia and Acarnania, but provides no specific details about constructions there. His account of Thermopylae is relatively detailed. He then discusses central Greece and the Peloponnese, noting that fortifications had long been in disrepair, but Justinian restored the walls of all cities, specifically naming Corinth, Athens, and Plataea. To protect the entire peninsula, the Isthmus of Corinth was fortified, (Note: De aed., IV.II 27-28) possibly explaining why Procopius provides no further details about Peloponnesian cities. The narrative continues along the eastern coast, focusing more on Thessaly, where he erroneously includes Diocletianopolis. He mentions the reconstruction of fortifications at Echinos, Thebes, Pharsalus, Demetrias, and others. After discussing Euboea, a lacuna of unknown length interrupts the text, resuming with Macedonia. Little is said about Macedonia—only the Long Wall across the Pallene Peninsula, the rebuilding of Cassandreia, and a fortress at the mouth of the Axios River are mentioned. (Note: De aed., IV.III 21-30)

Analyzing the lists of geographical names in Book IV poses significant challenges. For instance, the list for Macedonia includes 46 names, only a few of which have been reliably identified. In 1974, English archaeologist Michael Vickers addressed the founding of Thessaloniki, noting that, based on other written sources and archaeological data, Thessaloniki was established on the site of Therme, yet Therme appears in Procopius' list of Macedonian fortresses fortified under Justinian. One view holds that Procopius' data contradicts other sources, as fortifying Therme near Thessaloniki would have been pointless. Assuming the list is geographically ordered, Vickers concludes that Procopius' Therme was west of Kavala, 165 km from Thessaloniki. Efforts have been made to verify Procopius' information. The most studied sections concern the fortifications of Thermopylae (Note: De aed., IV.II 2-22) and the Isthmus of Corinth. (Note: De aed., IV.II 27-28) Procopius highlights Justinian's foresight in building walls and fortresses, not relying on chance. However, despite their detail, these accounts lack precise topographical information, with only the restored walls of Corinth and Hexamilion reliably located. Until excavations in the 1930s by Spyridon Marinatos, skepticism prevailed about Procopius' topographical data on Thermopylae, based on 19th-century travelers' misconceptions. Excavations confirmed Justinian-era constructions, but later studies questioned or disproved such datings (e.g., for the walls of Echinos and Nicopolis). Despite extensive excavations at Thermopylae and Hexamilion, including radiocarbon dating, it is often confirmed that Procopius attributed to Justinian achievements from earlier reigns. Notably, Procopius omits religious constructions in Greece, despite evidence of significant Justinian-era churches, such as the large Basilica of Leonidas near Corinth.

Procopius' account of Greece was also compared with his other works and those of other authors. Thermopylae is mentioned in the Secret History regarding the reorganization of Peloponnese defenses, where local peasants were replaced by 2,000 soldiers funded by public entertainment revenues, leading to neglected public buildings in "all of Greece, even Athens," and an inability to undertake "other good deeds". (Note: Anec., XXVI 31-34) In the same chapter, Procopius accuses Justinian of similar neglect across the empire, where "no one could care for public construction, and public lamps no longer burned in cities". (Note: Anec., XXVI 7) The claim about theater closures is archaeologically unverifiable, and an early Justinian novella encouraged performances. Numerous churches and public buildings were constructed in Greece under Justinian, though their funding sources are unknown. The restoration of Corinth's walls is mentioned by John Malalas, linked to repairs after the 521/522 earthquake, attributed to Justin I's reign. However, the Secret History attributes this and other earthquakes, as well as the Plague of Justinian, to Justinian's demonic nature. (Note: Some argue that in the Secret History, Procopius considered Justin I's reign part of Justinian's.) Inscriptions on Hexamilion stones praising Justinian are also known.

=== Book V: Asia Minor and Palestine ===
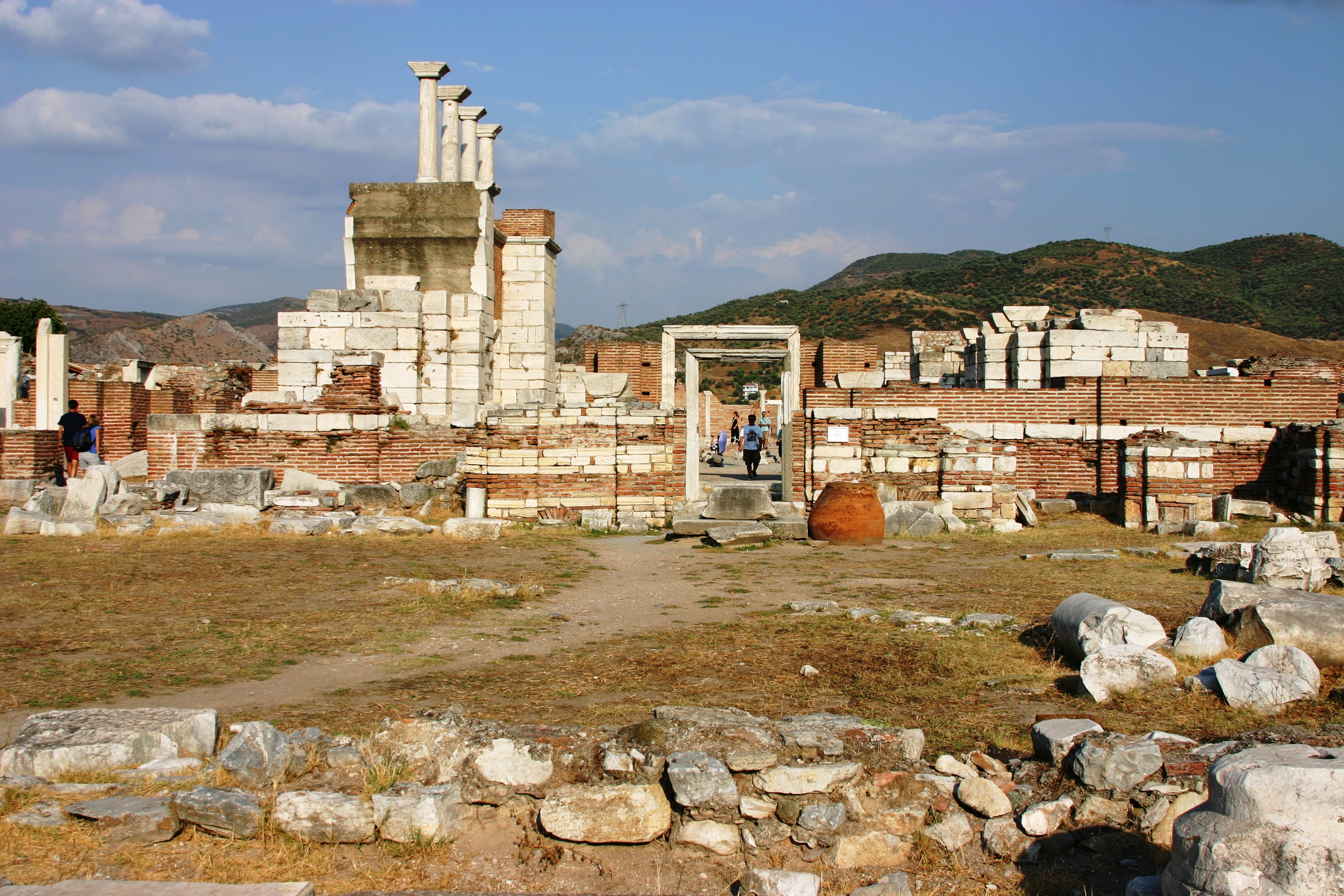
Ruins of the Basilica of St. John in Ephesus.

Various parts of Asia Minor are covered in Books II, III, and V. The first two address the eastern frontiers, while Book V focuses on its main landmarks. After briefly mentioning the basilica dedicated to John the Evangelist in Ephesus, Procopius discusses notable granaries built on Justinian's orders on the island of Tenedos. Located 15 km south of the Dardanelles exit, the island was on the route of grain caravans from Byzantine Egypt to Constantinople. The granaries, "ninety feet wide, two hundred eighty feet long, and of inexpressible height", (Note: De aed., V.I 14) allowed ships to unload in a convenient harbor during strong headwinds and acquire goods for the return journey. Excavations for the granary on Tenedos have not been conducted, (Note: As of 2001.) but available information does not contradict its existence. Justinian prioritized grain supply to the capital, as evidenced by his edict of 538/539. However, similar granaries, built around 131 under Emperor Hadrian in the Lycian cities of Patara and Andriake, are known. If the Tenedos granary's height matched the Lycian ones, it was about 10 meters. Book V then describes cities along the pilgrimage route through Asia Minor, starting in Constantinople and passing through the Bosporus, Chalcedon, Nicomedia, Nicaea, Ancyra, Cappadocia, the Cilician Gates, Cilicia, Syria, and Palestine. To understand why Procopius' list begins with Helenopolis in Bithynia, one must consider the Secret History, where he accuses Justinian of destroying the public road system, forcing travel from Chalcedon to Dakibiza by sea. (Note: Anec., XXX.8) The Byzantine road between Helenopolis and Nicaea was identified by modern researchers, and Procopius' data on the Drakon River and its two bridges proved accurate. Among the typical praises, the mention of the Siberis River and the town of Sikeia, linked to Theodore of Sykeon, is noteworthy. Until the late 20th century, Sikeia's location was unknown. Research in 1996 and 2001 resolved this, identifying structures described by Procopius and Theodore's hagiography. Regarding the bridge over the Sangarius, beyond the dating issues discussed above, technical challenges arise. The bridge is now nearly 4 km from the Sangarius, crossing a minor tributary called Melas in Byzantine times. Additionally, the bridge's breakwater design differs from other known Roman bridges. Despite the river flowing south to north, the breakwaters of all six piers are rounded to the south and pointed to the north. One theory suggests Justinian aimed to implement Pliny the Younger's plan to connect Lake Sapanca to the Gulf of Nicomedia by redirecting the Sangarius. However, this project would have been impractical economically and geographically. According to Michael Whitby, the breakwater design can be explained by the river's channel characteristics.

The final three chapters of Book V detail Justinian's achievements in Palestine, listing 22 projects of varying detail, including monasteries, churches, walls, charitable institutions, and wells. This list was likely compiled from prefecture records in the 550s. It includes major projects like the wall in Tiberias, (Note: By 1993, about 50 m of the wall, 2.5 m thick, was excavated, with an estimated total length of 2.8 km.) as well as minor ones. The major reconstruction of the Church of the Nativity is not mentioned, possibly because it occurred before or after the work's completion. Procopius provides the most detailed accounts for the New Church in Jerusalem, the church on Mount Gerizim, and the monastery on Mount Sinai. The New Church, dedicated to the Theotokos, is described first among Palestinian monuments. This account can be compared with a near-contemporary description by Cyril of Scythopolis, whose protagonist is the monk Sabbas the Sanctified. At his initiative, construction began under Anastasius I, but remained incomplete by 531, when the 93-year-old Sabbas visited the court with financial requests for his ecclesiastical province. Sabbas' mission succeeded, securing funds to complete the church, which was consecrated 12 years later in 543. Cyril describes the construction circumstances but notes only its magnificence, inviting readers to see it themselves. In contrast, Procopius omits the early construction phase, names only Justinian among the builders, and details the structure's design. (Note: De aed., V.IV) The New Church's location was unknown for a long time; its ruins were discovered in the mid-1970s in Jerusalem's Jewish Quarter. This confirmed several of Procopius' claims, particularly about the unusually large foundation stones, averaging 4 tons, with some reaching 8.5 tons and over 2 meters in length—significant, though smaller than blocks in the Temple Mount from the Second Temple period. Procopius describes the challenges of transporting such large stones. While archaeologists found no direct evidence of a specially built road, Nahman Avigad suggests the main Jerusalem street, the Cardo, was completed in the 6th century. The interpretation of Procopius' description of columns "resembling the color of fire" is debated; Israeli archaeologist Yoram Tsafrir suggests they may be made of Jerusalem stone quarried nearby. Overall, Tsafrir argues that Justinian's reputation as Byzantium's greatest builder, at least in Jerusalem, is well-deserved.

=== Book VI: Africa ===
Procopius' information on Byzantine North Africa is a valuable complement to the limited archaeological data from the region. (Note: The only structure in both Libyas reliably dated to Justinian's reign is the mosaic floor of a church in Olbia, Libya.) The book begins with a geographical description of the African provinces, divided into two after the separation of Cyrenaica — Upper Libya (or Pentapolitan Libya) and Lower Libya. Unlike other books, Book VI lists relatively few structures. According to Procopius, five fortresses were built in Upper Libya and two in Lower Libya under Justinian, along with two churches and a restored aqueduct in Upper Libya. Even less is reported for Lower Libya. The principle behind Procopius' selection of material in Africa is unclear.

Many Byzantine fortresses are known in Libya, though few have been excavated, and many have been surveyed. Three fortresses mentioned by Procopius have been identified with some certainty: Antipyrgon in Lower Libya, and Teucheira and Boreum in Upper Libya. Without Procopius' references, the arguments for these identifications are less convincing. Some of his claims have sparked debate. His account of the complete reconstruction of the walls of Berenice and Paratonium may reflect his tendency to exaggerate Justinian's achievements. Numerous observations on the dating of churches and military structures in Libya come from English archaeologist Richard Goodchild. He suggests that many small fortresses near Boreum, using similar masonry, may date to the same period. Goodchild also proposed identifying a Jewish settlement near Boreum, with a temple founded by King Solomon, (Note: De aed., VI.II 21-22) as Scina, also known as Locus Judaeorum Augusti; this identification is not universally accepted.

== Manuscripts and editions ==
According to Jacob Haury (1895), the manuscripts of this work are divided into two groups, derived from cod. Vaticanus graec. 1065 from the 13th century (designated V by Haury) and cod. Ambrosianus 182 from the late 14th century (A). Haury's brief analysis of the manuscript tradition noted that V is of higher quality but did not include a collation of textual variants. Subsequent studies of the manuscript tradition have not advanced significantly, and in the re-edition of Procopius' works, Gerhard Wirth reproduced Haury's article on the subject. Minor notes on textual variants and manuscript preservation were provided by Italian philologist Eduardo Luigi De Stefani. The 1940 English edition by H. B. Dewing did not explore textual criticism, but in 1947, Glannville Downey, who contributed to this edition, shared his observations. He argued that the differences suggest A represents an earlier draft of the work. Downey noted that the primary differences between the manuscripts occur in Book I, which focuses on Justinian I's construction activities in Constantinople, the most significant book. He suggested that if Procopius had planned a second edition, this book would have undergone the most thorough revision. The author's concluding apology ("All that I could learn of Justinian's constructions, either as an eyewitness or from those who witnessed them, I have set forth here to the best of my ability. I am well aware that I have omitted much in my account, either unnoticed due to the vast number of his constructions or simply unknown to me. Thus, if someone wishes to investigate all this precisely and record it, they will realize they have done a necessary task and will earn honor and glory for it") (Note: De aed., VI.VII 18-20) appeared in the first draft and was retained in the second, as it too remained unfinished. In 1952, because some manuscripts of On Buildings also contain the text of Constantine VII's De Administrando Imperio, these were studied by Agostino Pertusi, who was preparing an edition of the latter. The Italian philologist refined the dating of V, attributing it to the 12th century. In 1991, new manuscripts of On Buildings were discovered, bringing the total to 15.

Little is known about how well the Byzantines knew this work by Procopius. Although the oldest manuscript V is combined with De Administrando Imperio (10th century), there is no evidence that Constantine VII used Procopius' information. The Byzantine encyclopedia Suda (10th century) also shows no awareness of the treatise. At the end of the 10th century, the Byzantine hagiographer Symeon Metaphrastes quoted the treatise.

The first Latin edition, prepared by Beatus Rhenanus in Basel in 1531, was based on a single manuscript, was incomplete, and contained errors. This edition was reprinted unchanged in Paris in 1543. Slightly better editions were produced by David Hoeschel (Augsburg, 1603) and Claude Maltret (1663, Paris). Maltret's edition remained the best for a long time. It was reprinted in Venice in 1729 and served as the basis for the 1838 edition by Karl Wilhelm Dindorf. According to German translator Otto Veh, the first translation of the treatise into French was by Martin Fumée in the late 16th century, though Veh did not specify where or when it was published. Thus, until 2011, the only confirmed French translation was by Louis Cousin, published in 1671. Veh also noted an English translation by Aubrey Stewart published in 1888 by the Palestine Pilgrims' Text Society. A Russian translation was completed in 1939 by Sergey Petrovich Kondratyev. A German translation by Otto Veh was published in 1977 as part of a five-volume collection of Procopius' works. In 2006, a Polish translation by P. Grotowski was released, followed in 2011 by a new French translation by Denis Roques and an Italian translation.

== Bibliography ==
=== Sources ===
- Procopius of Caesarea (1993). The War with the Persians. The War with the Vandals. Secret History. Monuments of Historical Thought (in Russian). Translated, with an introduction and commentary by A. A. Chekalova. Moscow: Nauka. p. 570. ISBN 5-02-009494-3.

==== In Latin ====
- Dindorfius, Guilelmus (1833–1838). Procopius. Corpus Scriptorum Historiae Byzantinae, 43–45. Vol. 1. Bonn: Weber.
- Dindorfius, Guilelmus (1833–1838). Procopius (PDF). Corpus Scriptorum Historiae Byzantinae, 43–45. Vol. 2. Bonn: Weber.
- Dindorfius, Guilelmus (1833–1838). Procopius. Corpus Scriptorum Historiae Byzantinae, 43–45. Vol. 3. Bonn: Weber.
- Haury, Jacobus (1905–1913). Procopii Caesariensis opera omnia. Vol. 4. Leipzig: Teubner.
  - Haury, Jacobus; Wirth, Gerhard (1962–1964). Procopii Caesariensis opera omnia. Vol. 4 (Revised edition with additions and corrections ed.). Leipzig: Teubner.
    - Haury, Jacobus (2001). Procopii Caesariensis opera omnia. Vol. IV. Leipzig: Teubner. p. 408. ISBN 3-598-71737-7.
- Dewing, H. B.; Downey, Glanville (1914–1940). Procopius. Loeb Classical Library. Vol. 7. London: Heinemann.

==== In modern languages ====
- Procopius of Caesarea (1939). On Buildings (in Russian). Vol. 4. Translated by S. P. Kondratyev. pp. 203–283.
- Veh, O. (1977). Prokop: Works. Vol. V. Munich: Heimeran. ISBN 3-7765-2109-0.
- Procopius of Caesarea. War with the Goths (in Russian).
- Procope de Césarée (2011). Denis Roques; E. Amato; J. Schamp (eds.). Constructions of Justinian I (in French). Introduction, translation, commentary, maps, and index by Denis Roques (posthumous publication). Alessandria: Edizioni dell'Orso. pp. XII + 469 + 10 maps. ISBN 9788862742962.

=== Researches ===
In English

- Brown, A. (2010). "Justinian, Procopius, and Deception: Literary Lies, Imperial Politics, and the Archaeology of Sixth-Century Greece". In Turner, A. J.; Chong-Gossard, K. O.; Vervaet, F. J. (eds.). Private and Public Lies: The Discourse of Despotism and Deceit in the Graeco-Roman World. Vol. II. pp. 355–372.
- Cherf, W. J. (2011). "Procopius De aedificiis 4.2.1–22 on the Thermopylae Frontier". Byzantinische Zeitschrift. 104 (1). De Gruyter: 71–113. doi:10.1515/byzs.2011.005. ISSN 1864-449X.
- Croke, B.; Crow, J. (1983). "Procopius and Dara". The Journal of Roman Studies. 73: 143–159. doi:10.2307/300078. JSTOR 300078.
- Cameron, Averil (1985). Procopius and the Sixth Century. Berkeley: University of California Press. p. 308. ISBN 0-415-14294-6.
- Downey, Glanville (1947). "The Composition of Procopius, De Aedificiis". Transactions and Proceedings of the American Philological Association. 78: 171–183. doi:10.2307/283492. JSTOR 283492.
- Downey, Glanville (1950). "Justinian as a Builder". The Art Bulletin. 32 (4): 262–266. doi:10.2307/3047311. JSTOR 3047311.
- Elsner, J. (2007). "The Rhetoric of Buildings in the De Aedificiis of Procopius". In James, L. (ed.). Art and Text in Byzantine Culture. pp. 33–57.
- Evans, J. A. S. (1969). "The Dates of the Anecdota and the De Aedificiis of Procopius". Classical Philology. 64 (1): 29–30. doi:10.1086/365441. JSTOR 268008.
- Evans, J. A. S. (1996). "The Dates of Procopius' Works: A Recapitulation of the Evidence". GRBS. 37: 301–313.
- Greatrex, G. (1994). "The Dates of Procopius' Works". GRBS. 18: 101–114.
- Greatrex, G. (2013). "The Date of Procopius' Buildings in the Light of Recent Scholarship". Estudios Bizantinos. 1: 13–29. ISSN 2014-9999.
- Greatrex, G. (2014). "Perceptions of Procopius in Recent Scholarship" (PDF). Histos. 8: 76–121. ISSN 2046-5963.
- Gregory, G. (2001). "Procopius on Greece". Antiquité Tardive. 8: 105–114. doi:10.1484/J.AT.2.300689.
- Hohlfelder, R. L. (1988). Mediterranean Cities: Historical Perspectives. Psychology Press. pp. 54–62. ISBN 0-7146-3353-4.
- Howard-Johnson, James (2001). "The Education and Expertise of Procopius". Antiquité Tardive. 8: 19–30. doi:10.1484/J.AT.2.300682.
- Lawrence, A. W. (1983). "A Skeletal History of Byzantine Fortification". The Annual of the British School at Athens. 78: 171–227. doi:10.1017/S0068245400019687.
- Kaldellis, A. (2004). Procopius of Caesarea: Tyranny, History, and Philosophy at the End of Antiquity. University of Pennsylvania Press. ISBN 978-0-8122-0241-0.
- Mackay, P. A. (1963). "Procopius' De Aedificiis and the Topography of Thermopylae". American Journal of Archaeology. 67 (3): 241–255. doi:10.2307/501370. JSTOR 501370.
- Montinaro, F. (2015). "Power, Taste and the Outsider: Procopius and the Buildings Revisited". In Greatrex, G.; Elton, H. (eds.). Buildings. Routledge. pp. 191–206. ISBN 978-1-317-05545-7.
- Reynolds, J. (2001). "Byzantine Buildings, Justinian and Procopius in Libya Inferior and Libya Superior". Antiquité Tardive. 8: 169–176. doi:10.1484/J.AT.2.300695.
- Tsafrir, Y. (2001). "Procopius and the Nea Church in Jerusalem". Antiquité Tardive. 8: 149–164. doi:10.1484/J.AT.2.300693.
- Whitby, M. (1985). "Justinian's Bridge over the Sangarius and the Date of Procopius' De Aedificiis". The Journal of Hellenic Studies. 105: 129–148. doi:10.2307/631526. JSTOR 631526.
- Whitby, M. (2001a). "Procopius' Buildings, Book I: A Panegyrical Perspective". Antiquité Tardive. 8: 45–57. doi:10.1484/J.AT.2.300684.
- Whitby, M. (2001b). "Pride and Prejudice in Procopius' Buildings: Imperial Images in Constantinople". Antiquité Tardive. 8: 59–66. doi:10.1484/J.AT.2.300685.
- Zanini, E. (2003). "The Urban Ideal and Urban Planning in Byzantine New Cities of the Sixth Century A.D.". Theory and Practice in Late Antique Archeology. 1: 196–224. doi:10.1163/22134522-90000009. ISSN 1570-6893.

In German

- Belke, K. (2001). "Procopius' De Aedificiis, Book V, on Asia Minor". Antiquité Tardive (in German). 8: 115–125. doi:10.1484/J.AT.2.300690.
- Rubin, Berthold (1960). The Age of Justinian (in German). Vol. I. Berlin: Walter de Gruyter.

In Russian

- Weimarn, E. V. (1980). "Who Could the Goths in Crimea Have Been Defending Against with Procopius' "Long Walls"?". Antique and Medieval History (in Russian) (17). Sverdlovsk: 19–33.
- Diehl, Charles (1908). Justinian and Byzantine Civilization in the 6th Century (in Russian). St. Petersburg: Book on Demand Ltd. p. 687.
- Udaltsova, Z. V. (1971). "The Worldview of Procopius of Caesarea". Byzantine Chronicle (in Russian). 31: 8–22.
- Firsov, L. V. (1979). "On the Position of the Land of Dori in Taurica". Byzantine Chronicle (in Russian). 40: 104–113.

In French

- Flusin, B. (2001). "Remarks on the Manuscript Tradition of De Aedificiis". Antiquité Tardive (in French). 8: 9–17. doi:10.1484/J.AT.2.300681.
- Roques, D. (1998). "The Buildings of Justinian by Procopius of Caesarea: Document or Monument?". Comptes rendus des séances de l'Académie des Inscriptions et Belles-Lettres (in French): 989–1001.
