= Glanum Dam =

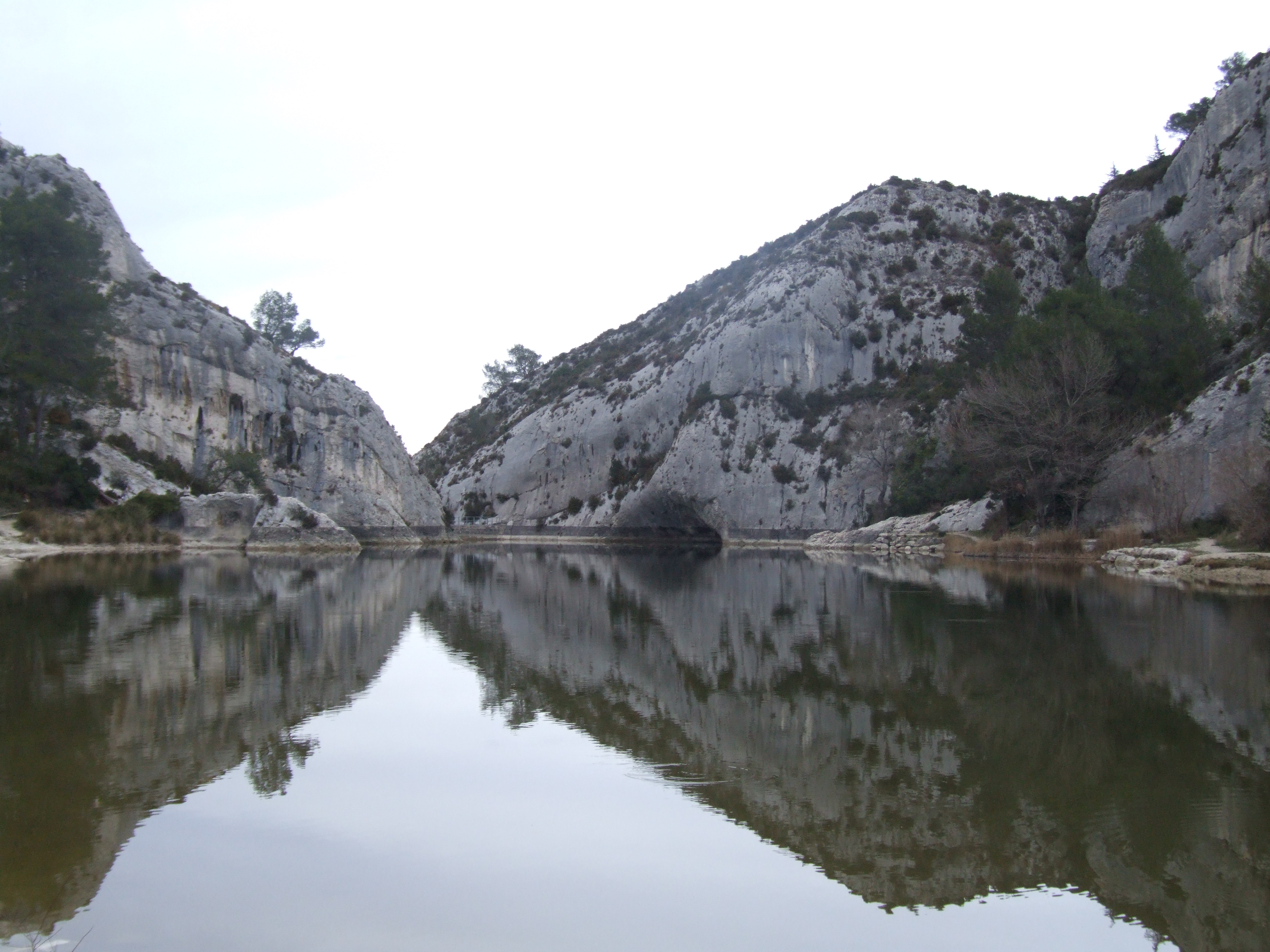

- Location within France
- Location: Glanum (Saint-Rémy-de-Provence), Bouches-du-Rhône, France
- Coordinates: 43°46′17″N 4°49′44″E
- Opening date: 1st century BC

Dam and spillways
- Impounds: Vallon de Baume
- Height: 12 m (39 ft)
- Length: 18 m (59 ft)
- Width (base): 3.9 m (13 ft)

Reservoir
- Creates: Lac des Peiròu

The Glanum Dam, also known as the Vallon de Baume dam, was a Roman arch dam built to supply water to the Roman town of Glanum, the remains of which stand outside the town of Saint-Rémy-de-Provence in Southern France. It was situated south of Glanum, in a gorge that cut into the hills of the Alpilles in the Roman province of Gallia Narbonensis. Dating to the 1st century BC, it was the earliest known dam of its kind. The remains of the dam were destroyed during the construction of a modern replacement in 1891, which now facilitates the supply of water to Saint-Rémy-de-Provence in the Bouches-du-Rhône region of France.

The remains of the Roman dam at Glanum were discovered in 1763 by Esprit Calvet. A recent study shows that the dam originally was composed of two curved parallel masonry walls, each around 1 metre (3.3 ft) thick and separated by a gap around 1.5 metres (4.9 ft) wide which was likely filled with earth and rubble. The cut stone blocks were held together by crampons and finished with cordon joints designed to protect against water entry. At each end of the dam there was an abutment cut into the rock of the gorge. Overall the dam stood 6 metres (20 ft) high with a thickness of 3.5 metres (11 ft).

Its dimensions and location in a steep-sided gorge point towards it being a true arch dam. The dam collected water that was fed into an aqueduct that in turn supplied the Roman town of Glanum.

A modern arched dam was constructed on the same site in 1891, destroying the remains of the Roman dam. The dam's reservoir is called in French the Lac de Peirou and is accessible via the Chemin du Barrage.

== See also ==
- List of Roman dams and reservoirs
- Roman architecture
- Roman engineering
- Dara Dam
- Iron Gate (Antioch)
