= Maronite Chronicle of 713 =

Anonymous world chronicle

The Maronite Chronicle of 713 is an anonymous world chronicle that covers history from creation to the year AD 692–693. Originally written by Maronites in Syriac, it is known only from an Arabic translation found in a single manuscript from Saint Catherine's Monastery in Sinai. Although long noted in catalogues of Sinaitic manuscripts, its uniqueness as a historical source was only brought to light in 2024.

== Title and date ==
The title of the work given in the manuscript is the Arabic Kitāb al-sinīn wa-l-azmina ("The Book of Years and Times"), which is glossed with "called in Greek Chronikon". Partially on the basis of this reference to the Greek word, Adrian Pirtea assigns it the conventional title Maronite Chronicle of 713.

The Chronicle dates events by the Seleucid era. There is one reference to "the present", which is the Seleucid year 1024, corresponding to between October 712 and September 713. The last event recorded, however, is dated twenty years earlier, to 692–693. For this reason, Alexander Hourani uses the title Chronicle of the Year 693.

== Language and milieu ==
The original language of the Chronicle was Syriac, but no copy of this text is known. The surviving Arabic translation was probably made in the 11th century. The Chronicle of 713 should not be confused with the Maronite Chronicle of 664, which does survive in Syriac.

The anonymous Chronicle was produced in a Maronite milieu. It shows Chalcedonian and Monothelite sympathies and also features the Monastery of Saint Maron.

== Synopsis ==
The Chronicle is 141 pages long in the manuscript. Following a preface, the history proper begins with Adam from the Book of Genesis. Ancient history, much of it taken from the Old Testament, is covered laconically down to the conquests of Alexander the Great (336–323 BC). There follows chronological lists of the rulers of the Seleucid Empire, Ptolemaic Kingdom, Hasmonean Kingdom and Roman Empire. The passion of Jesus is dated to the nineteenth year of the reign of the Roman emperor Tiberius.

Church history is then intertwined with the history of the Roman Empire and Sasanian Empire down to the Roman–Sasanian War of 602–628. This is followed by the rise of Islam. The 7th-century material draws on a lost Greek or Syriac source that was also used as a source by Theophanes the Confessor, Agapius of Hierapolis, Michael the Great and the anonymous Syriac Chronicle of 1234. The last event is the breaking of the truce between Romans and Muslims at the battle of Sebastopolis in 692.

== Manuscript ==
The Chronicle is known from a single manuscript, Sinai Arabic 597, kept at Saint Catherine's Monastery in Sinai. It is a composite manuscript of the codex type made from two originally separate manuscripts bound together. Both manuscripts are made of paper. The first part dates to the 10th century. It has a note added by a reader dated to the year 1002. It contains Arabic translation of the Book of Daniel and the Book of Proverbs based on the Syriac Peshitta. The second part, containing the Chronicle, dates to the 13th century.

The manuscript may be the "book of history in old script with its pages stuck to one another" that Porfirij Uspenskij saw at Sinai in 1850. It is recorded with only brief descriptions of its content in various subsequent catalogues of Sinai's Arabic manuscripts. In the earliest catalogue, Margaret Gibson identified the Chronicle as a history of the world. This was based on the library label, ἱστορία τοῦ κόσμου in Greek. Aziz Atiya in his catalogue gives the title of the work found in the manuscript, Book of the History of Years and Times. He identifies the script as later Naskh.

The uniqueness and significance of the Chronicle was first noticed by Andrea Pirtea of the Austrian Academy of Sciences in January 2024, who brought it to the attention of scholarship and published the first study on it. Independent scholar Alexander Hourani has since provided a draft transcription of the Arabic and an incomplete English translation (work in progress).

== Works cited ==
- Atiya, Aziz S. (1955). The Arabic Manuscripts of Mount Sinai. A Hand-list of the Arabic Manuscripts and Scrolls Microfilmed at the Library of the Monastery of St. Catherine, Mount Sinai. The Johns Hopkins Press.
- Gibson, Margaret (1894). Catalogue of the Arabic Mss. in the Convent of S. Catharine on Mount Sinai. C. J. Clay and Sons.
- Hourani, Alexander (February 2025). "The chronicle of the year 693 in Sinaitic Arabic 597: English translation". Academia.edu.
- Hourani, Alexander (April–May 2025). "The chronicle of the year 693 in Sinaitic Arabic 597". Academia.edu.
- Pirtea, Adrian C. (2025). "A Hitherto Unknown Universal History of the Early Eighth Century: Preliminary Notes on the Maronite Chronicle of 713" (PDF). Medieval Worlds (23): 155–167. doi:10.1553/medievalworlds_no23_2025s155.
