= Gunnar Brands =

German classical archaeologist

Gunnar Brands (born 30 March 1956), is a German classical archaeologist.

He was born in Duisburg, Germany, and attended the classical Landfermann-Gymnasium, graduating in 1977. He then studied classical and Christian Archaeology, Ancient History and Latin at Bonn University (Rheinische Friedrich-Wilhelms-Universität), Heidelberg University and Rome. He also worked on early Roman architecture in Italy at Bonn University under Hanns Gabelmann, and received his doctorate on Classical Archeology in 1985. He received a travel grant from the German Archaeological Institute in 1987, and was a research fellow working on the site of Sana'a in the Yemen Arab Republic in a project operated by that Institute. From 1988 to 1994 he was an assistant at the Institute of Classical Archaeology at the Free University of Berlin, where he habilitated in 1994 with a thesis on the late antique architecture of Syria. In the same year he became assistant professor at the Department of Building and Art History at the Brandenburg Technical University in Cottbus. Since 1996, he has been professor of Christian Archaeology and Byzantine Art History at the Institute for Oriental Archaeology and Art History at the In 1993/94 and 2000/01 he was a Fellow for Byzantine Studies at Dumbarton Oaks. and a Fulbright Fellow. He is a corresponding member of the German Archaeological Institute.

Brands conducts research on antique and early Christian architecture of the Eastern Roman Empire, especially Syria, Asia Minor and southern Arabia. He is particularly interested in the architectural decoration of Late Antiquity and the topography of Eastern Christianity, but his interest extends to Hellenistic and Roman architecture, and the heritage of antiquity from the Renaissance and the 20th Century. He has done field research in Antakya, Turkey, the present name of the ancient city of Antioch on the Orontes River.
