= 526 Antioch earthquake =

Earthquake striking Syria and Antioch in 526

- Location within Syria
- Local date: Probably between 20 and 29 May 526, (the Maronite Chronicle of 713 gives the date as 29 May)
- Local time: Mid-morning
- Magnitude: 7.0 M_{s}
- Epicenter: 36.23°N 36.12°E
- Areas affected: Byzantine Empire (now Turkey and Syria)
- Max. intensity: MMI VIII (Severe) – MMI IX (Violent)
- Casualties: 250,000–300,000+

The 526 Antioch earthquake struck Syria and, in particular, the city of Antioch in the Byzantine Empire. It occurred some time in late May 526, probably between 20 and 29 May, during mid-morning, killing approximately 250,000 people. This was in the seventh year of the reign of the Byzantine emperor Justin I and occurred under the consulship of Olybrius. In Antioch the earthquake was followed by a fire that destroyed most of the buildings left standing after the earthquake. The maximum intensity in Antioch is estimated to have been between VIII (Severe) and IX (Violent) on the Mercalli intensity scale.

== Tectonic setting ==
The site of Antioch lies close to the complex triple junction of the northern end of the Dead Sea Transform, the mainly transform boundary between the African plate and the Arabian plate; the southwestern end of the East Anatolian Fault, the mainly transform boundary between the Anatolian Plate and the Arabian plate; and the northeastern end of the Cyprus Arc, the boundary between the Anatolian and African plates. The city lies on the Antakya Basin, part of the Amik Basin, filled by Pliocene to recent alluvial sediments. The area has been affected by many large earthquakes over the last 2,000 years.

== Earthquake ==
The estimated magnitude for the earthquake is 7.0 on the surface-wave magnitude scale. It was followed by 18 months of aftershocks. Intensity estimates on the Mercalli scale are: VIII–IX for Antioch, and VII for both Daphne, a suburb of Antioch, and the port town of Seleucia Pieria.

== Damage ==
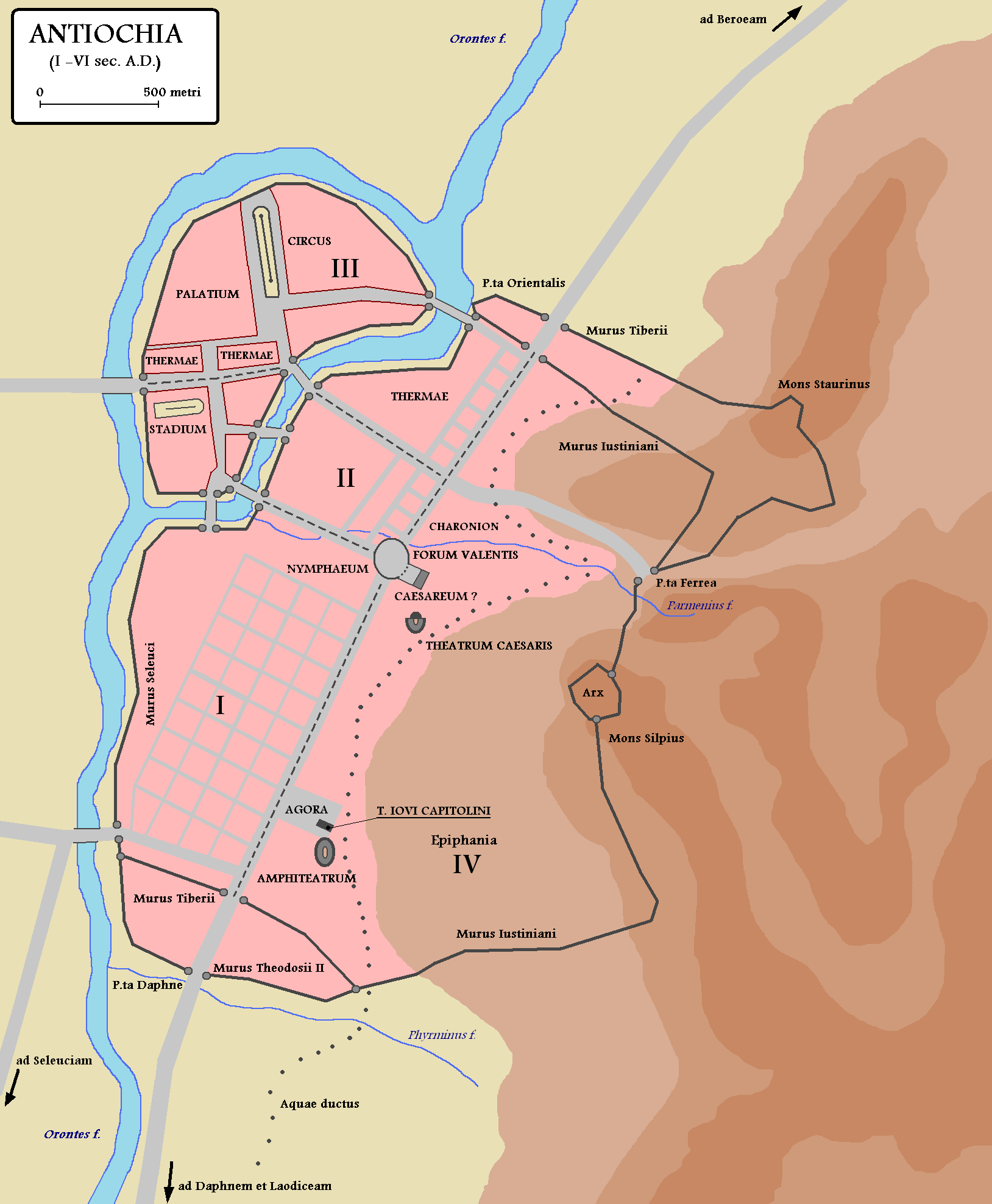
Map of Antioch in the 6th century

The earthquake caused severe damage to many of the buildings in Antioch, including Constantine the Great's great octagonal church Domus Aurea, built on an island in the Orontes River. Only houses built close to the mountain were said to have survived. Most of the damage, however, was a result of the fires that went on for many days in the immediate aftermath of the earthquake, made worse by the wind. The fire was described as so intense that there was a literal rain of fire, leaving the city of Antioch entirely desolate.

The Great Church was destroyed by the fire seven days after the earthquake. Amongst the many victims was Euphrasius, the Patriarch of Antioch, who died after falling into a cauldron of pitch being used by wineskin makers, with only his head remaining unburnt.

In the port of Seleucia Pieria an uplift of 0.7–0.8 metres (2 ft 4 in – 2 ft 7 in) has been estimated, and the subsequent silting up of the harbour left it unusable.

Estimates of the death toll for this earthquake vary between 250,000 and 300,000, with 250,000 being the most commonly reported. It has been suggested that the very high number of casualties was a result of there being a large number of visitors in the city from the surrounding countryside, there to celebrate Ascension Day.

The effects of the earthquake were further exacerbated by the ensuing lawlessness that was a result of the breakdown of the local government and necessary services. Many of the survivors gathered their families and belongings and fled the ruins of the city; however, many of these people were set upon by other victims or inhabitants who lived outside the city who robbed and murdered them for their belongings.

== Aftermath ==
The contemporary Chronicle of John Malalas, a native of Antioch, is the main primary source that describes the impact of the earthquake. After the fires subsided a frantic rescue effort was undertaken by those who remained to free those trapped in the rubble. Many were trapped under rubble because so many buildings in the city collapsed due to the earthquake. Many of those who were rescued nonetheless died soon afterwards from their injuries. It was reported that many inhabitants remained buried under rubble for up to 30 days but were able to survive. There were even reports of babies being born in the rubble and surviving along with their mothers. Another reported miracle was that on the third day after the earthquake the Holy Cross appeared in the clouds above the northern district of the city, leading those who saw it to weep and pray for an hour. The sophist Procopius of Gaza wrote among his works a monody on the event.

In Constantinople, Emperor Justin I reportedly reacted to the news of the earthquake by removing his diadem and crimson chlamys. He entered the church without these symbols of his rank and publicly lamented the destruction of Antioch. He arranged for ambassadors to be sent to the city with sufficient money for both immediate relief and to start Antioch's reconstruction. The rebuilding of the Great Church and many other buildings was overseen by Ephraim, the comes Orientis, whose efforts saw him replace Euphrasius as the Chalcedonian Patriarch of Antioch. Many of the buildings erected after the earthquake were destroyed by another major earthquake in November 528, although there were far fewer casualties.

In the eighth year and ninth month of his reign, Justin I appointed his nephew Justinian I co-emperor. Justinian immediately made considerable efforts to increase the aid sent to Antioch for its reconstruction, with specific emphasis on the rebuilding of Christian holy sites. He built a Church of Mary, mother of Jesus across from the building known as the basilica of Rufinus. Another church, the Church of Saints Cosmas and Damian, was erected in the same area. Justinian's wife Theodora also aided in the rebuilding of the city. She commissioned the building of a church honouring the archangel Michael. Additionally, she arranged for the construction of the basilica of Anatolius, with columns sent from Constantinople.

Justinian I also funded efforts to repair the civil services of the city. Under his leadership the hospice was repaired, in addition to baths and cisterns, allowing for a return of the inhabitants to Antioch. Moreover, Justinian I also hunted down and prosecuted individuals who had rioted, and had robbed and murdered the innocent during the chaos that followed the earthquake and breakdown of the local government. Many of the guilty were sentenced to death while others were severely punished. The punishments disregarded the factional allegiances of the individuals.

== See also ==
- 115 Antioch earthquake
- 1872 Amik earthquake
- 2023 Turkey–Syria earthquakes
- List of earthquakes in Turkey
- List of earthquakes in the Levant
- List of historical earthquakes
- List of natural disasters by death toll
