= Maronite Chronicle of 664 =

The Maronite Chronicle of 664 is an anonymous annalistic chronicle in the Syriac language completed shortly after 664. It is so named because its author appears to have been a Maronite. It survives today only in a single damaged 8th- or 9th-century manuscript in London, British Library Add. 17,216. Owing to the damage, portions of the chronicle are lost.

The original Chronicle began with Creation and continued down to 664. It was written shortly after this date, since the author writes that there was no Arab attack in a particular region after 664 up to the present. The author shows the Maronites winning a debate with the Syrian Orthodox and is sympathetic to the Byzantines, whose victories over Abd al-Rahman ibn Khalid in Anatolia it dutifully reports. He must have been writing before the Sixth Ecumenical Council (680–681), when the Maronites broke with the pro-Byzantine Melkites.

The beginning of the chronicle is lost; the surviving text begins with Alexander the Great. The part covering the late fourth century through the mid-seventh is also lost, but the last part from 658 on survives. It is the only Syriac chronicle to cover the years 660–664. It correctly names the days of week for particular dates, suggesting that many of its passages were written shortly after the events.

The Maronite Chronicle provides some unique information on the early Umayyad Caliphate. In general it favours the Umayyad Muawiyah over the Caliph Ali in the First Arab Civil War. It is the earliest source to record the Islamic battle cry, "God is great". It reports with disdain the Syrian Orthodox had accepted the status of dhimma and paid the jizya after losing a debate with the Maronites. It is also the only literary witness to Muawiyah's minting of gold and silver coin, which now has some archaeological confirmation.

== Excerpts ==
- AG 969 [658 CE] ...Mu'awiya, Hudhayfa, his sister's son, and Mu'awiya gave orders that he be put to death. 'Ali, too, threatened to go up once again against Mu'awiya, but they struck him while he was at prayer in al-Hira and killed him. Mu'awiya then went down to al-Hira where all the Arab forces proffered their right hands to him, whereupon he returned to Damascus.
- AG 970 [June 659] [There was an earthquake in Palestine.] In the same month the bishops of the Jacobites — Theodore and Sabukht — came to Damascus and held an inquiry into the Faith with the Maronites in the presence of Mu'awiya. When the Jacobites were defeated, Mu'awiya ordered them to pay 20,000 denarii and commanded them to be silent. Thus there arose the custom that the Jacobite bishops should pay that sum of gold every year to Mu'awiya, so that he would not withdraw his protection [lit. "loose his hand upon them"] and let them be persecuted by the members of the Maronite Church. The person called "Patriarch" by the Jacobites fixed the financial burden that all the converts of monks and nuns should contribute each year to the payment in gold and he did the same with all the adherents of his faith. He bequeathed his estate to Mu'awiya so that out of fear of that man all the Jacobites would be obedient to him. [There was another earthquake.]
- AG 971 [660] many Arabs gathered at Jerusalem and made Mu'awiya king and he went up and sat down on Golgotha; he prayed there and went to Gethsemane and went down to the tomb of the blessed Mary to pray in it. In those days when the Arabs were gathered there with Mu'awiya, there was an earthquake. [Much of Jericho fell, as well as many nearby churches and monasteries.] In July of the same year the emirs and many Arabs gathered and gave their allegiance to Mu'awiya. Then an order went out that he should be proclaimed king in all the villages and cities of his dominion and that they should make acclamations and invocations to him. Mu'awiya also minted gold and silver, but it was not accepted because there was no cross on it. Furthermore, Mu'awiya did not wear a crown like other kings in the world. He placed his throne in Damascus and refused to go to Muhammad's throne.
- AG 972 [661] ... When Mu'awiya had acquired the power to which he had aimed and was at peace from the wars of his people, he broke the pact with the Romans and refused to accept peace from them any longer. Rather he said, "If the Romans want peace, let them surrender their weapons and pay gzîtâ".

== See also ==
- Qais al-Marouni
