= 528 Antioch earthquake =

Earthquake striking Syria and Antioch in 528

- Location within Syria
- Local date: 29 November 528
- Magnitude: M_{s} 7.1
- Epicenter: 36.25°N 36.10°E
- Areas affected: Byzantine Empire (present-day Turkey and Syria)
- Max. intensity: MMI XI (Extreme)
- Casualties: 4,870 fatalities

The 528 Antioch earthquake was the second major earthquake to affect the city in a span of two years. The shock occurring on 29 November, estimated at M_{s} 7.1, was viewed by its residents as the end of a series of disasters that had plagued Antioch. It killed at least 4,870 people and razed the remaining buildings that did not collapse in the earthquake of 526, and newly constructed ones.

== Tectonic setting ==
The site of Antioch lies close to the complex triple junction between the northern end of the Dead Sea Transform, the mainly transform boundary between the African plate and the Arabian plate, the southwestern end of the East Anatolian Fault, the mainly transform boundary between the Anatolian Plate and the Arabian plate, and the northeastern end of the Cyprus Arc, the boundary between the Anatolian and African plates. The city lies on the Antakya Basin, part of the Amik Basin, filled by Pliocene to recent alluvial sediments. The area has been affected by many large earthquakes during the last 2,000 years. The modern city of Antioch, now Antakya, was devastated by earthquakes in 1872 and 2023.

== Earthquake ==
The earthquake had an estimated surface-wave magnitude and local magnitude of 7.1 and 6.9, respectively. The maximum Modified Mercalli intensity was assigned in Antioch and Latakia, at X–XI (Extreme). Shaking was assigned IV (Light) in Lebanon.

== Historical descriptions ==
The earthquake was heavily documented in accounts by John Malalas and Procopius. Malalas documented a series of disasters that began with a fire in 525 that destroyed parts of the city. The following year, an earthquake and fire that followed levelled the entirety of Antioch, killing about 250,000 people. In an attempt to make sense of the devastation he witnessed, Malalas viewed the 528 earthquake and preceding events as connected to each other.

The earthquake destroyed every building that had been reconstructed or left intact following the 526 earthquake. John of Ephesus wrote that the Great Church was destroyed. Antioch's city walls were razed, and damage was also reported in nearby cities. Tax exemptions was put in place as a relief measure. Unlike the earthquake of 526, there was no conflagration, hence, many inhabitants believed God's had shielded them from further catastrophe.

A harsh winter arrived after the earthquake causing further misery. Its residents walked a mile away from the city barefoot in a ceremonial form, to plead for God's mercy. Repentance became a common method of moral support as residents began to believe in a narrative that the series of disasters were intended to purify the city. This belief influenced the decision to rename the city to Theopolis.

When news of the calamity reached other cities, they held prayers and observed mourning. News also reached Justinian I, ruler of the Byzantine Empire, who was in Byzantium. The city's residents also observed several days of prayers. The remaining residents of Antioch fled the city for other settlements or settled in the mountains nearby. Damage was reported in villages within a 10 mi (16 km) radius of Antioch. However, the cities of Defne and Seleucia Pieria escaped unscathed.

== See also ==
- List of earthquakes in Turkey
- List of earthquakes in the Levant
- List of historical earthquakes
