= Syria earthquake =

Syria earthquake or Earthquake(s) (in) Syria may refer to:

- 1138 Aleppo earthquake
- 1157 Hama earthquake
- 1170 Syria earthquake
- 1202 Syria earthquake
- 1344 Syria earthquake
- 1796 Latakia earthquake
- 1822 Aleppo earthquake
- 2023 Turkey–Syria earthquakes

== See also ==
- List of earthquakes in the Levant
