= 847 Damascus earthquake =

Earthquake affecting Syria and Lebanon

- Location within Syria
- Local date: 24 November 847
- Magnitude: 7.3 M_{w}
- Epicenter: 34.4°N 36.3°E
- Fault: Yammouneh Fault
- Areas affected: Bilad al-Sham, Abbasid Caliphate (modern Lebanon and Syria)
- Max. intensity: MMI VIII (Severe)
- Casualties: 70,000

The 847 Damascus earthquake occurred (probably on 24 November) in AD 847. Recent scholarship suggests that the earthquake was part of a multiple earthquake stretching from Damascus to the south, to Antioch in the north and to Mosul in the east. There were an estimated 20,000 casualties in Antioch according to the 13th-century historian and writer Al-Dhahabi, and 50,000 in Mosul. It is thought to be one of the most powerful earthquakes along the Dead Sea Transform.

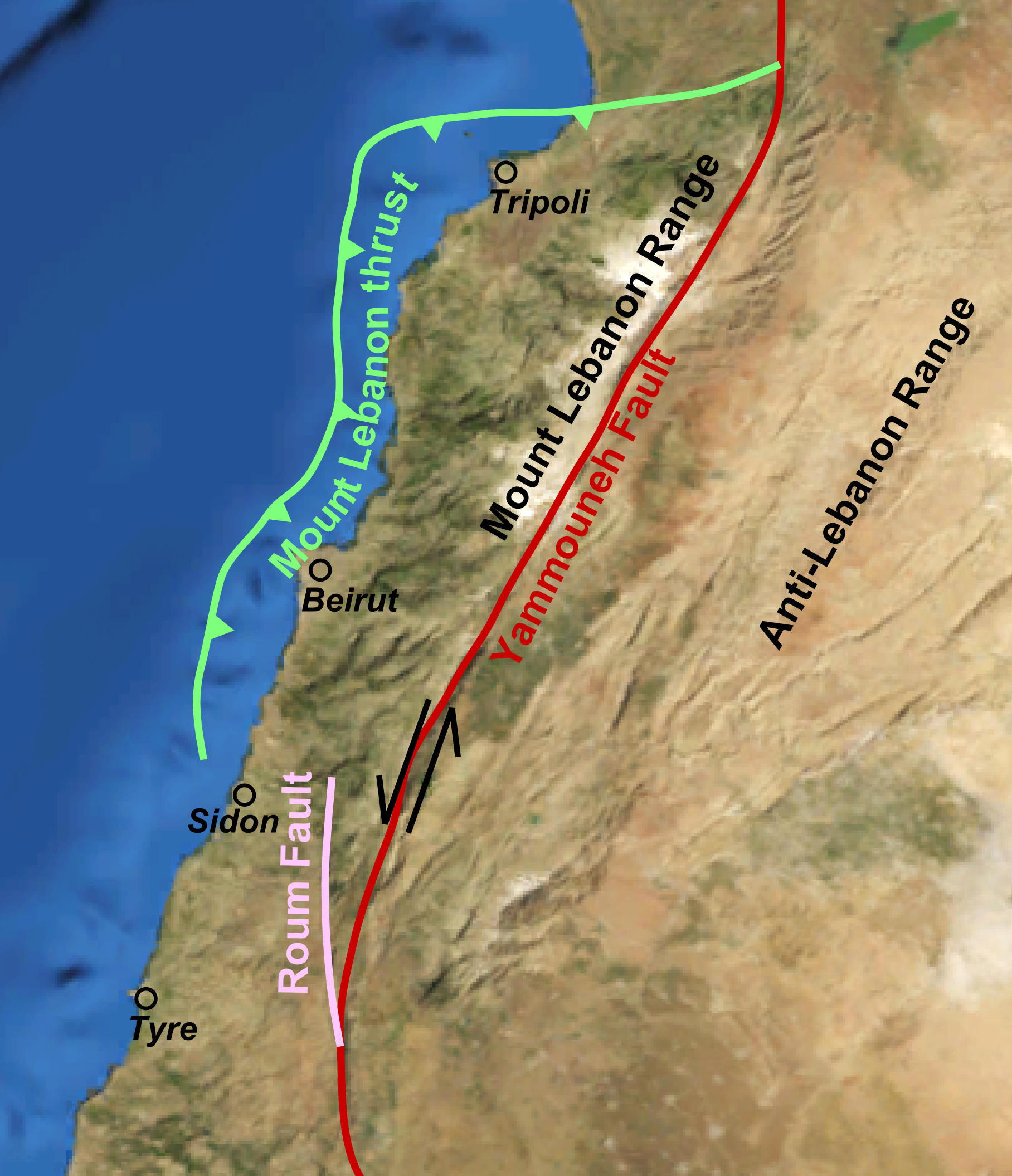
The Dead Sea Transform fault and associated structures in Lebanon and southern Syria

== Tectonic setting ==
The northern Levant lies across the Dead Sea Transform (DST), the mainly strike-slip boundary between the Arabian plate and the African plate. In Lebanon the DST has a SW-NE trend that has caused transpression and the formation of the Mount Lebanon range and the Anti-Lebanon range. The main fault strand is the Yammouneh Fault, which has been the location of several major earthquakes, such as the 1202 Syria earthquake and the Near East earthquakes of 1759. The 847 earthquake has also been linked to movement on this fault.

== Other earthquakes in 847 A.D. ==
A number of other towns and cities in the Middle East also suffered major destruction in 847 A.D., probably on the same day (24 November). The earthquake in Antioch may have been the same one which destroyed much of Damascus, Syria on 24 November 847. The Damascus earthquake began around dawn, lasting until at least midday; part of the Umayyad (Great) Mosque was destroyed and its minaret fell down. Bridges and houses collapsed, and huge stones were displaced. Other towns near Damascus were destroyed including Darayya. There was destruction in towns in Homs (Syria), in Lebanon, and also in the region of the Jazira (Upper Mesopotamia). There was also a large earthquake in Mosul (now in Iraq), in which up to 50,000 people were killed.

Similar records exist in the western Mediterranean too and Rome was hit by a heavy earthquake that year causing a landslide on the Capitoline Hill.

== See also ==
- List of earthquakes in the Levant
- List of earthquakes in Turkey
- List of historical earthquakes
