= 1837 Galilee earthquake =

1837 earthquake in Galilee

Galilee earthquake of 1837
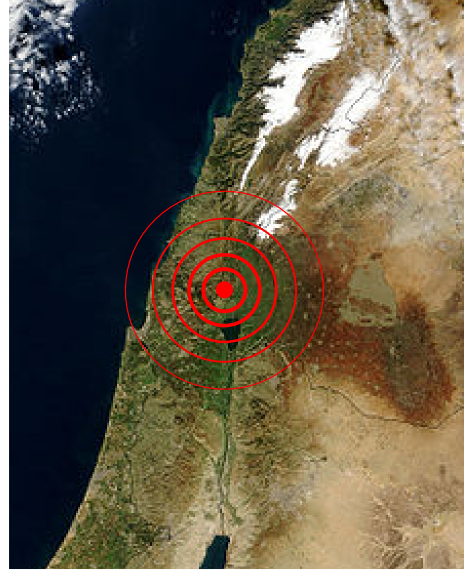
- Local date: January 1, 1837
- Local time: 16:00
- Duration: 20 seconds
- Magnitude: 6.25–6.5 M_{L} 7.0 M_{s} 7.0–7.1 M_{s}
- Epicenter: 33.0°N 35.5°E
- Areas affected: Ottoman Syria
- Max. intensity: MSK-64 VIII (Damaging); EMS-98 VIII (Heavily damaging)
- Casualties: 6,000–7,000

The Galilee earthquake of 1837, often called the Safed earthquake, shook the Galilee on January 1 and is one of a number of moderate to large events that have occurred along the Dead Sea Transform fault system that marks the boundary of two tectonic plates; the African plate on the west and the Arabian plate on the east. Intensity assessments for the event were VIII (Damaging) on the Medvedev–Sponheuer–Karnik scale and VIII (Heavily damaging) on the European Macroseismic Scale.

A 1977 assessment of the event that was published in the Bulletin of the Seismological Society of America had the epicenter just north of the city of Safed and the magnitude of 6.25–6.5, but in 1997 seismologist Nicholas Ambraseys argued that the event may have been more substantial. The event was well-documented by the 19th-century missionary, archaeologist, and author William McClure Thomson. The region in which the earthquake occurred was formally part of the Ottoman Empire, but at the time it was under control of the Egyptians, who were occupying after they had seized it during conflict.

== Earthquake ==
The main shock occurred on Sunday, January 1, 1837, around four in the afternoon, followed by a second strong shock five minutes later, and was felt as far as 500 kilometers (310 mi) away. Damascus's maximum perceived intensity was estimated to be VII (Very strong) on the Medvedev–Sponheuer–Karnik scale, while Ramla and Baalbek were at VI (Strong), and cities such as Cairo, Tarsus, and Gaziantep (formerly Aintab) were at III (Weak).

== Account ==
William McClure Thomson arrived in Beirut in 1833 for missionary work and was in the area at the time of the earthquake. He wrote, in fine detail, of the damage and personal tragedies he witnessed during his travels in The Land and the Book. The book was published in 1859 and remained a best seller through much of the 19th century. In the region, the Egyptians (led by Ibrahim Pasha of Egypt) had recently succeeded in overpowering the Ottomans and gained control of Southern Syria during the Egyptian–Ottoman War (1831–1833). During his time in the area, Thomson was jailed with charges of spying. The Egyptians were ultimately flushed from the region by the Ottomans.

== Damage ==
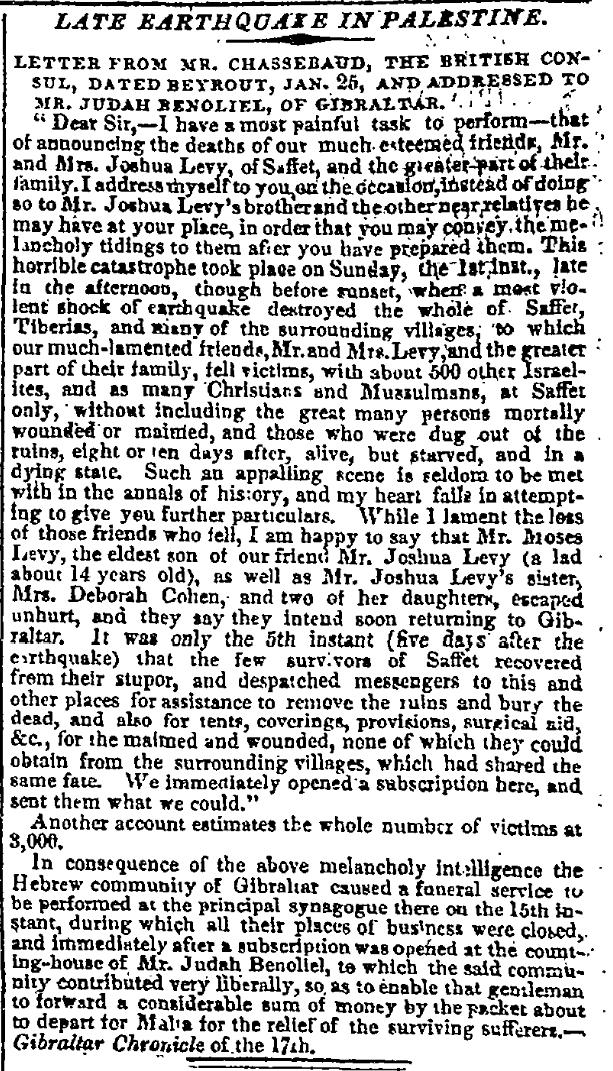
Galilee Earthquake report in The Times, 1 March 1837

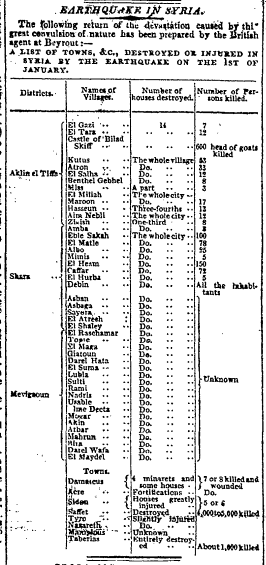
The Times report of Apr 12, 1837, with a table of casualties

The shock was comparatively slight in Beirut, but many houses were damaged and others completely destroyed. The wintertime slowed communication in the area, and nearly eight days passed before reliable reports came in from Safed regarding the nature of damage there. The letters stated that the town, along with Tiberias and many other villages, had been overthrown. Sidon was damaged considerably, and in Tyre the fallen homes made the streets nearly impassable, with people sleeping in boats and in tents alongside the shore. The village of Rumaish was mostly destroyed, with 30 deaths occurring as people were crushed in their homes, and many more would have suffered the same had they not been at evening prayers at the church there, which was a small building that was not seriously damaged.

The types of homes that were built in that time and area, usually one story rubble masonry with heavy flat roofs that were often already damaged, were not resistant to even a small amount of shaking. Public structures like bridges and walls fared better, as they were usually constructed with higher standards. The heavy damage in certain areas occurred for various reasons. Some cities were built on steep hillsides overlooking the plains (done for security reasons), while other sites were located on unstable soil where landslides had occurred previously. These conditions made assessing the intensity of the earthquake difficult, but Ambraseys settled on a maximum value of VII–VIII (Very strong–Damaging) on the Medvedev–Sponheuer–Karnik scale for the event. That scale was used primarily in Europe and the Soviet Union up until the 1990s. A higher loss of life was probably seen as a result of the earthquake occurring on a winter evening, as most people were likely in their homes preparing dinner.

Every house and the local church in the village of Jish was destroyed, and all the parishioners, totaling 135 people, were killed, with only the priest surviving the collapse of the vaulted stone roof there. The priest was protected by an arch over the altar. American scholar Edward Robinson passed through the village of Lubya, just west of the Sea of Galilee, in 1838 and noted that it had suffered greatly from the earthquake the preceding year, with 143 villagers reported dead.

In Safed, the homes on the hill were built in such a way that the roofs of the houses below became the streets for the ones above; the cascading style of construction was many layers deep, and when the earthquake happened, the homes collapsed onto one another from above. Many people were killed immediately and buried under the rubble, and some were fortunate to be alive yet could not extricate themselves quickly from the debris. Some survivors were pulled from the ruins as many as six or seven days after the earthquake. The wounded and dying there were without much relief until January 19 when a temporary hospital was set up and a doctor hired who could distribute medicine and apply bandages.

In Tiberias heavy damage was sustained, though not quite as severe as in Safed, and 600 people were killed there, with many homes and the walls of the city being destroyed. The wounded were transported to hot springs in that area for relief, and there may have been changes to the volume of water emanating from them at the time of the earthquake. As a result of the earthquake, a strong seiche (standing wave) swept the shores of Tiberias causing additional deaths.

== Aftermath ==
Three large aftershocks occurred several weeks after the main event. On January 16 in the northern end, January 22 near the middle, and in the north again on May 20 near the city of Hasbaya (west of Damascus). The aftershocks were spread over a distance of 70 kilometers (43 mi) and that length matches the north–south region of the epicentral area that was mapped by Ambraseys and could indicate that the Roum fault, and its extension south to the Sea of Galilee, were sources of the event.

In the months and years following the earthquake, houses and lands lost to their dead owners were settled by emigrants who had recently come from Russia, Germany, Poland, and elsewhere.

== Analysis ==
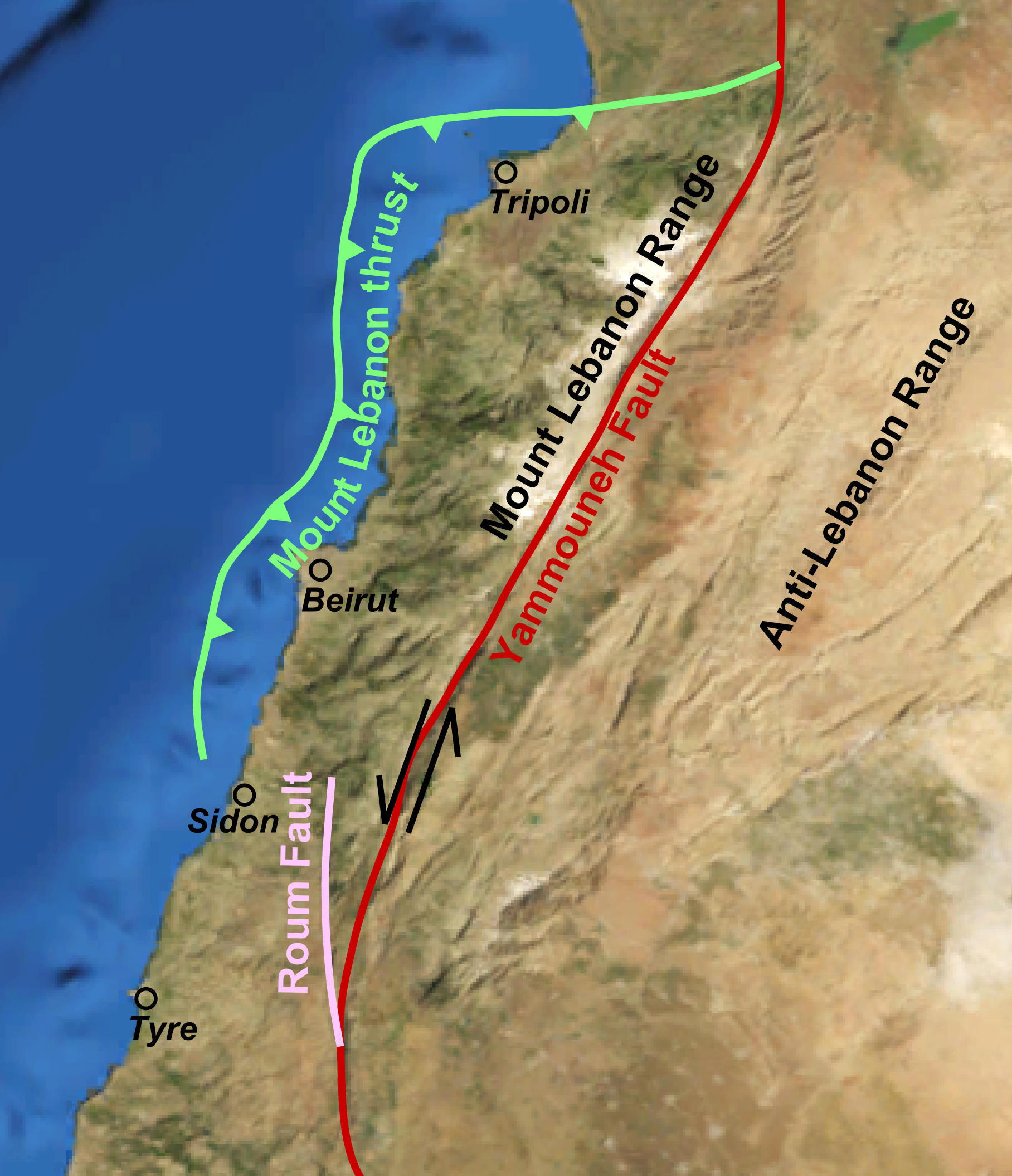
The Yammouneh fault in Lebanon

The Dead Sea Transform, also known as the Levant Fracture, produces strong but infrequent earthquakes, and all pre-instrumental information regarding the area shows that it was experiencing an inactive period during the 20th century. Researchers M. Vered and H. L. Striem conducted a study on both the 1927 Jericho earthquake and the January 1837 event, with a close look at damage data to gain a good estimate of Modified Mercalli intensity values. The 1927 event was both macroseismically and instrumentally recorded, and that provided a good opportunity to closely examine the macroseismic and instrumental epicenter location, estimates of its depth, and methods used in the macroseismic investigation. Once validated, the processes of analyzing the macroseismic data were applied to the earlier 1837 event. The meizoseismal areas of both of these Jordan Rift Valley events were along a north–south line near the fault zone.

Several other previous events occurred in the same region, and by comparison both the 1202 Syria earthquake and the Near East earthquakes of 1759 had larger magnitudes than the 1837 event and have been associated with the Yammouneh fault in Lebanon. However, no other earthquakes of similar size occurred in the Dead Sea zone after seismometers began being used around the turn of the 20th century, so Nicholas Ambraseys mapped the intensity values reported from more than 120 locations within the affected area and used the values to create a relationship with a group of 158 earthquakes in nearby Turkey and northern Syria with known intensities and magnitudes to predict the surface-wave magnitude for this event. The average radius of the isoseismals in the area helped to estimate a magnitude of 7.0 to 7.1 for the event.

== See also ==
- List of historical earthquakes
- List of earthquakes in the Levant
