= 92 BC =

92 BC in various calendars
- Gregorian calendar: 92 BC; XCII BC
- Ab urbe condita: 662
- Ancient Egypt era: XXXIII dynasty, 232
- Pharaoh: Ptolemy X Alexander, 16
- Ancient Greek Olympiad (summer): 172nd Olympiad (victor)¹
- Assyrian calendar: 4659
- Balinese saka calendar: N/A
- Bengali calendar: −685 – −684
- Berber calendar: 859
- Buddhist calendar: 453
- Burmese calendar: −729
- Byzantine calendar: 5417–5418
- Chinese calendar: 戊子年 (Earth Rat); 2606 or 2399 — to — 己丑年 (Earth Ox); 2607 or 2400
- Coptic calendar: −375 – −374
- Discordian calendar: 1075
- Ethiopian calendar: −99 – −98
- Hebrew calendar: 3669–3670
- Hindu calendars
- Vikram Samvat: −35 – −34
- Shaka Samvat: N/A
- Kali Yuga: 3009–3010
- Holocene calendar: 9909
- Iranian calendar: 713 BP – 712 BP
- Islamic calendar: 735 BH – 734 BH
- Javanese calendar: N/A
- Julian calendar: N/A
- Korean calendar: 2242
- Minguo calendar: 2003 before ROC 民前2003年
- Nanakshahi calendar: −1559
- Seleucid era: 220/221 AG
- Thai solar calendar: 451–452
- Tibetan calendar: ས་ཕོ་བྱི་བ་ལོ་ (male Earth-Rat); 35 or −346 or −1118 — to — ས་མོ་གླང་ལོ་ (female Earth-Ox); 36 or −345 or −1117

Year 92 BC was a year of the pre-Julian Roman calendar. At the time it was known as the Year of the Consulship of Pulcher and Perperna (or, less frequently, year 662 Ab urbe condita) and the First Year of Zhenghe. The denomination 92 BC for this year has been used since the early medieval period, when the Anno Domini calendar era became the prevalent method in Europe for naming years.

== Events ==
=== By place ===
==== Roman Republic ====
- Consuls: Gaius Claudius Pulcher and Marcus Perperna.
- In the first diplomatic contact between Rome and Parthia, Sulla meets with a Parthian envoy, resulting in the parties recognizing the Euphrates as a common frontier.
- Sulla repulses Tigranes of Armenia from Cappadocia.
- Gaius Sentius becomes Roman governor of Macedonia. He serves until 88 BC.

==== Levant ====
- 92 BC Levant earthquake, earthquake mentioned in catalogues of historical earthquakes. An earthquake and a tsunami reportedly affected areas of the Levant, including the modern states of Cyprus, Egypt, Israel, and Syria.

== Births ==
- Publius Clodius Pulcher, Roman politician (d. 52 BC)

== Deaths ==
- Antiochus XI Epiphanes, king of the Greek Seleucid Empire, drowned
