= List of earthquakes in the Levant =

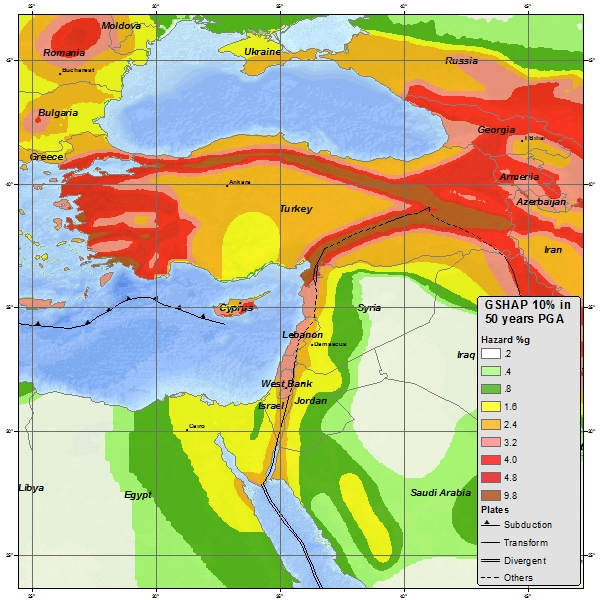
Seismic hazard for the Eastern Mediterranean from the Global Seismic Hazard Assessment Program (GSHAP) in terms of peak ground acceleration with a 10% chance of being exceeded (or a 90% chance of not being exceeded) within the next 50 years

This is a list of earthquakes in the Levant, including earthquakes that either had their epicenter in the Levant or caused significant damage in the region. As it is now, the list is focused on events which affected the territories of modern-day Israel, Jordan, Lebanon, Palestine and Syria and to some degree the adjacent areas of south Anatolia, Cyprus island and the Sinai Peninsula (modern Turkey, Cyprus and Egypt).

== Seismic hazard ==
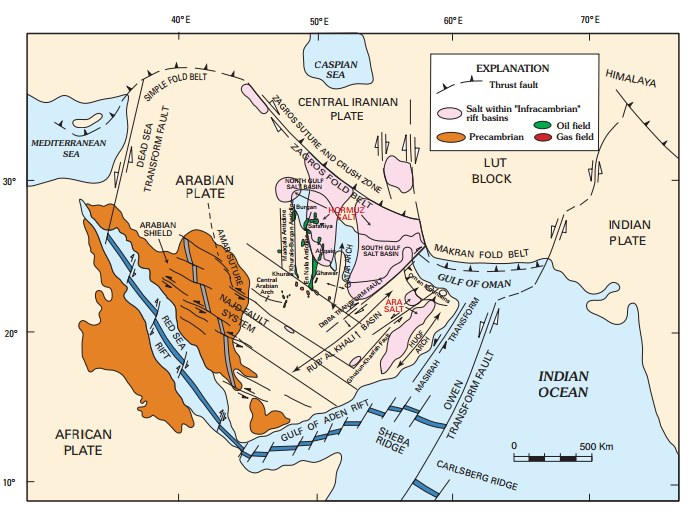
Arabian plate showing general tectonic and structural features

The Jordan Rift Valley is the result of tectonic movements within the Dead Sea Transform (DSF) fault system. The DSF forms the transform boundary between the African plate to the west and the Arabian plate to the east. The Golan Heights and all of Transjordan are part of the Arabian plate, while the Galilee, The Palestinian territories, coastal plain and Negev along with the Sinai Peninsula are on the African plate. This tectonic disposition leads to relatively high seismic activity in the region.

== Earthquakes ==
The region has experienced many earthquakes, the most destructive ones being those of 31 BCE, 363 CE, 749 CE, and 1033 CE. The 1759 events, along with the earlier 1202 Syria earthquake, are likely the strongest historical earthquakes in the region. Some of the earthquakes were also followed by a tsunami – notably in 92 BCE, 115, 306, 502, 551, 881, 1202.

=== Historic quakes in Bronze and Iron Ages ===
- c.1700 BCE – the Canaanite palace of Tel Kabri destroyed in a major seismic event
- c.1500/1400 BCE – the city of Jericho destroyed and abandoned upon a major seismic event
- c.1365 BCE – A supposed violent earthquake that is claimed to have hit Ugarit in the Bronze Era is based on misinterpreting the evidence, especially Amarna letter 151 which actually only says that half of the royal palace was destroyed by fire. The layer of destruction of Ugarit supposed to represent archaeological evidence for the catastrophe is now redated to ca. 1250 BCE.
- c. 750 BCE – a major earthquake described in the book of Amos, affecting ancient Kingdom of Israel and Kingdom of Judah Suggested epicenter location is north of Israel. Estimation of the local magnitude range from 7.8 to 8.2, making it possibly the largest earthquake along the Dead Sea Transform.

=== Major earthquakes ===
- 140 BCE – disastrous earthquake between Tyre and Ptolemais (Acre/Akko)
- 92 BCE – Judean coast hit by tsunamis
- 31 BCE – 31 BCE Judea earthquake: epicenter in the Jordan Valley, magnitude at least 7; among the largest in 2000 years. Josephus Flavius writes of 30,000 people killed. Damages Emmaus and Straton's Tower (renamed Caesarea by Herod the Great).
- 26–36 CE (all following dates in this list are CE) – An earthquake, identified in the geological strata of the Dead Sea and by Roman sources, which could be the same one reported by the Gospels to have taken place during the crucifixion of Jesus
- 115 – 115 Antioch earthquake; Yavne and Caesarea are hit by a tsunami
- 130 – strong earthquakes affect among other places Caesarea, Lydda and Emmaus. Different sources give varying dates: 129, 131
- 306 – tsunami on the Levantine coast. Effects are felt in Caesarea, Tiberias, Jerusalem.
- 363 – the Galilee earthquake. See also next (365 CE) earthquake. The failed attempt of the Jews to rebuild the Jerusalem Temple during the reign of Emperor Julian is connected by some to the earthquake.
- 365 – 365 Crete earthquake triggered a large tsunami that inundated the Nile delta.
- 419 – earthquake causes destruction in Antipatris
- 502 – Ptolemais allegedly destroyed (Syriac chronicle of Joshua the Stylite), tsunami hits northern coast, Safed, Latrun (Nicopolis) affected
- 526 – 526 Antioch earthquake
- 528 – 528 Antioch earthquake
- 551 – 551 Beirut earthquake affects much of the Middle East, possibly largest event in the Levant. Gush Halav is destroyed. A major tsunami sweeps the coast from Caesarea to Tripoli, Lebanon
- 633 – affects Emmatha in the Yarmouk Valley and possibly nearby Abila of the Decapolis.
- 658 – affects Syria and Palestine. Jerusalem is badly damaged according to the chronicles of Michael the Syrian and Theophanes the Confessor.
- 672 – Ascalon, Gaza and Ramla hit by strong earthquake
- 746–749 – a series of earthquakes, often confused into one 749 Galilee earthquake. Tiberias, Baysan (Beit She'an) and Hippos were largely destroyed. A large event was centered in the Jordan Valley and had a magnitude of 7.6.
- 808 – An earthquake affects Jerusalem. The Dome of the Rock is severely damaged.
- 846 – The Dome of the Rock is severely damaged by an earthquake.
- 847 – 847 Damascus earthquake
- 881 – 881 Acre earthquake. An earthquake on the Levantine coast leads to a tsunami at Acre
- 1015 – The Dome of the Rock collapses due to an earthquake.
- 1016 – Jerusalem, Jaffa and the region around are affected
- 1033–34 – 1033 Jordan Rift Valley earthquake: a series of earthquakes which are felt for 40 days destroys Ramla, Jericho and Nablus 70,000 deaths.
- 1063 – a large earthquake hits the Levantine littoral. Acre is badly damaged
- 1068 – ground-rupturing event in Wadi Arabah. Ramla was totally destroyed and lay abandoned for four years after losing some 15,000–25,000 inhabitants in the earthquake.
- 1070 – a large earthquake centered in the Beqaa Valley affects Palestine
- 1091 – coastal towns affected, city towers collapse
- 1138 – 1138 Aleppo earthquake
- 1157 – 1157 Hama earthquake
- 1170 – 1170 Syria earthquake: Caesarea damaged by tremor
- 1202 – 1202 Syria earthquake, one of the largest seismic events in written history in the region. Often falsely quoted as having caused a million fatalities in the region, including fires and tsunamis, its true death toll was likely around 30,000
- 1261 – between Akko and Tripoli islands disappear under the sea
- 1344 – A M_{s} 6.6 earthquake struck northwestern Syria. Manbij was almost destroyed and 5,700 people died.
- 1660 – Tiberias hit by an earthquake.
- 1752 – coast of Syria and Palestine hit by strong earthquake
- 1759 – Near East earthquakes of 1759, likely among the strongest historical earthquakes in the region.
- 1796 – 1796 Latakia earthquake kills about 1,500 people.
- 1822 – 1822 Aleppo earthquake
- 1834 – 1834 Jerusalem earthquake: Jerusalem, Bethlehem, Hebron are affected
- 1837 – Galilee earthquake of 1837, known as the Safed earthquake. The Roum fault, and its extension south to the Sea of Galilee, were sources of the event
- 1856 – 1856 Heraklion earthquake: although the earthquake had an epicenter off the Greek island of Crete, shaking was severe in Cairo, Palestine and in North Africa. Some people were killed in the Nile delta and Cairo due to collapsing buildings.
- 1872 – 1872 Amik earthquake: At least 1,800 people were killed during an M_{s} 7.2 (MSK 64 = XI) quake in the Amik Valley. This earthquake is believed to have generated 50 km of surface rupture on the Amanos Fault.
- 1927 – 1927 Jericho earthquake. The epicenter was in the northern area of the Dead Sea. Jerusalem, Jericho, Ramle, Tiberias and Nablus were heavily damaged and at least 500 were estimated to have been killed. The death toll in Jerusalem included more than 130 people and around 450 were injured. About 300 houses collapsed or were severely damaged to the point of not being usable. The earthquake caused heavy damage to the domes of the Church of the Holy Sepulchre and the al-Aqsa Mosque, the Dome of the Rock being badly damaged. The earthquake was especially severe in Nablus where it destroyed around 300 buildings, including the Mosque of Victory and the historic parts of the Great Mosque of Nablus. The death toll in Nablus included more than 150 people and around 250 were injured. In Jericho, a number of houses collapsed, including several relatively new hotels in one of which three female tourists from India were killed. Ramla and Tiberias were also heavily damaged.
- 1955 – 1955 Alexandria earthquake caused damage in the Nile Delta and left at least 18 dead.
- 1969 – 1969 Sharm El Sheikh earthquake affecting the southern Sinai peninsula.
- 1995 – 1995 Gulf of Aqaba earthquake (also known as Nuweiba earthquake) occurred on November 22 at 06:15 local time (04:15 UTC) and registered 7.3 on the M_{w} scale.
- 2023 – 2023 Turkey–Syria earthquakes hit southern Turkey near the border with Syria, killing more than 50,000 people as of February 26, and is said to double, in Turkey and Syria. The European-Mediterranean Seismological Centre said tremors were felt in Greece, Lebanon, Cyprus, Jordan, Palestine, Israel, Iraq, Romania, Georgia, and Egypt. (Note: Limited to western Jordan, northeastern Iraq, Lebanon only with a brief earthquake warning issued by their respective governments but lifted later after tremors no longer felt in these countries.)

=== Minor earthquakes (below 6.0) ===
- 1898 – Haifa damaged by earthquake
- 1956 – Chim earthquake: In the south of Lebanon in the Chouf District; 6,000 homes destroyed, and another 17,000 damaged; 136 persons killed. Magnitude – 5.3–5.5 M_{w}.
- 2008 – A 5.1 M_{w} earthquake shook South Lebanon, causing ten injuries, power outages and some building damage on February 15. Of several hundred responses to the USGS' "Did you feel it?" system, three reports from northern coastal Israel indicated that a maximum Mercalli intensity of VI (Strong) was observed there. The oblique-slip shock was also felt lightly in Jerusalem, Nicosia, and Amman.
- 2020 – A series of 4.7 M_{w} earthquakes occurred at a depth of 20 kilometers in the eastern Mediterranean near Burj Islam, Syria.
- 2022 – An earthquake registering slightly more than 4.1 M_{w} just over a mile below the surface, centered northeast of Beit She'an, south of the Sea of Galilee, is felt throughout Israel; no injuries or damage are reported.
