= 1822 Aleppo earthquake =

Earthquake affecting the Middle East

- Location within Syria
- Local date: 13 August 1822
- Local time: 21:50
- Duration: 40 seconds
- Magnitude: 7.0 M_{s}
- Depth: 18 km (11 mi)
- Epicenter: 36.10°N 36.75°E
- Fault: St. Simeon Fault
- Type: Strike-slip
- Max. intensity: EMS-98 IX (Destructive)
- Casualties: 20,000–60,000

The northern part of the Ottoman Empire (now northern Syria and the Hatay Province of Turkey) was struck by a major earthquake on 13 August 1822. It had an estimated magnitude of 7.0 M_{s} and a maximum felt intensity of IX (Destructive) on the European macroseismic scale (EMS). It may have triggered a tsunami, affecting nearby coasts. Damaging aftershocks continued for more than two years, with the most destructive being on 5 September 1822. The earthquake was felt over a large area including Rhodes, Cyprus and Gaza. The total death toll reported for this whole earthquake sequence ranges between 30,000 and 60,000, although 20,000 is regarded as a more likely number.

== Tectonic setting ==
Aleppo is located close to the zone of faulting associated with the Dead Sea Transform, where the Arabian plate is moving northwards relative to the African plate at a rate of about 5 mm per year. The northernmost segment of the fault zone has been the location of many major earthquakes, including the 115 Antioch, 859 Syrian coast, 1138 Aleppo and 1170 Syria events.

== Earthquake ==
The earthquake sequence began with a series of foreshocks starting on 5 August, with the last major one occurring just half an hour before the mainshock on 13 August. The main shock lasted for 40 seconds, with three separate peaks in intensity. 30 aftershocks followed within the first 8 minutes. The aftershocks continued for nearly two and a half years, the most damaging of which occurred on 5 September 1822. The mainshock was felt with an intensity of VII (damaging) or greater on the EMS intensity scale over a large area, reaching a maximum of IX (destructive) at Jisr al-Shughur and Al-Qusayr.

Ambraseys found no evidence for a tsunami (seismic sea-wave) associated with this event. However, one source reports a tsunami that affected the coasts of Lebanon, the Gulf of Iskenderun and Cyprus.

It has been proposed that the earthquake was caused by left lateral strike-slip movement on the 140 km long St. Simeon Fault, which branches off the Missyaf Fault, part of the Dead Sea Transform.

== Damage ==
The earthquake caused severe damage over a large area, extending from Gaziantep to Antakya in modern Turkey and Aleppo to Khan Sheikhun in modern Syria. In the northernmost affected area, complete or near complete destruction was reported from the towns of Kilis, Gaziantep, Araplar, Burç, Kehriz and Sağçe. Further south Armanaz, Harem, Darkush, Jisr al-Shughur, Khan Shiekhun, Ariha, Idlib and Maarat were similarly affected.

== Aftermath ==
The damage at Aleppo was so severe that many people moved out of the city and most of the old centre was left unrepaired, with some new houses being built using wooden frames outside the ruined walls. The moat became filled with rubble from damaged buildings. The earthquake was one of the reasons that Aleppo became less important as a commercial centre during this period.

== See also ==
- List of earthquakes in the Levant
