= 1897 Mindanao earthquakes =

Earthquakes in the Philippines

- Local date: September 20, 1897, September 21, 1897
- Magnitude: 7.4, 7.5 M_{s}
- Epicenter: 6.0°N 122.0°E
- Max. intensity: MMI VII (Very strong); MMI IX (Violent)
- Tsunami: Both
- Casualties: None reported, 13 to 100+

The 1897 Mindanao earthquakes occurred on September 20, 1897, at 19:06 UTC and September 21, 1897, at 05:12 UTC. The estimated epicentres of the two earthquakes are identical, lying just off the southwestern coast of Mindanao in the Philippines, south of Basilan island. The earthquakes were originally given estimated magnitudes of 8.6 and 8.7 on the surface-wave magnitude scale by Charles Richter, but these were revised downwards by Katsuyuki Abe to 7.4 and 7.5 M_{s}, respectively. Contemporary reports noted that with few exceptions, all the masonry buildings in Zamboanga and Basilan were left in ruins.

Both earthquakes triggered tsunamis, with the second being quite destructive, with a maximum run-up of 7.0 m. The tsunami was noted all along the southwest coast of Negros, the west coast of Panay, the south coast of Palawan, the west coast of Mindanao, and the east coast of Borneo. At least 13 died as a result of the second tsunami, with a hundred or more casualties also being reported.

== See also ==
- 1918 Celebes Sea earthquake
- 1976 Moro Gulf earthquake
- List of earthquakes in the Philippines
- List of historical earthquakes
