= 1867 Keelung earthquake =

Earthquake and tsunami affecting the northern coast of Taiwan

1867 Keelung earthquake and tsunami
- Location within Taiwan
- Local date: December 18, 1867
- Local time: morning
- Magnitude: 6.8 M_{L} 7.0–7.24 M_{w}
- Depth: 10 km (6.2 mi)
- Epicenter: 25.34°N 121.91°E
- Areas affected: Taiwan
- Max. intensity: CWA 7
- Tsunami: 15 m (49 ft)
- Casualties: 580 dead; 100+ injured

The 1867 Keelung earthquake occurred off the northern coast of Taiwan on the morning of December 18 with a magnitude of 7.0. It produced strong shaking that seriously damaged the cities of Keelung and Taipei. A tsunami drowned hundreds and had a run-up exceeding 15 m (49 ft), possibly the only confirmed widely destructive and deadly tsunami in Taiwan's history. The total death toll was estimated to be 580 while more than 100 were injured. It was followed by aftershocks that were felt on average ten times a day.

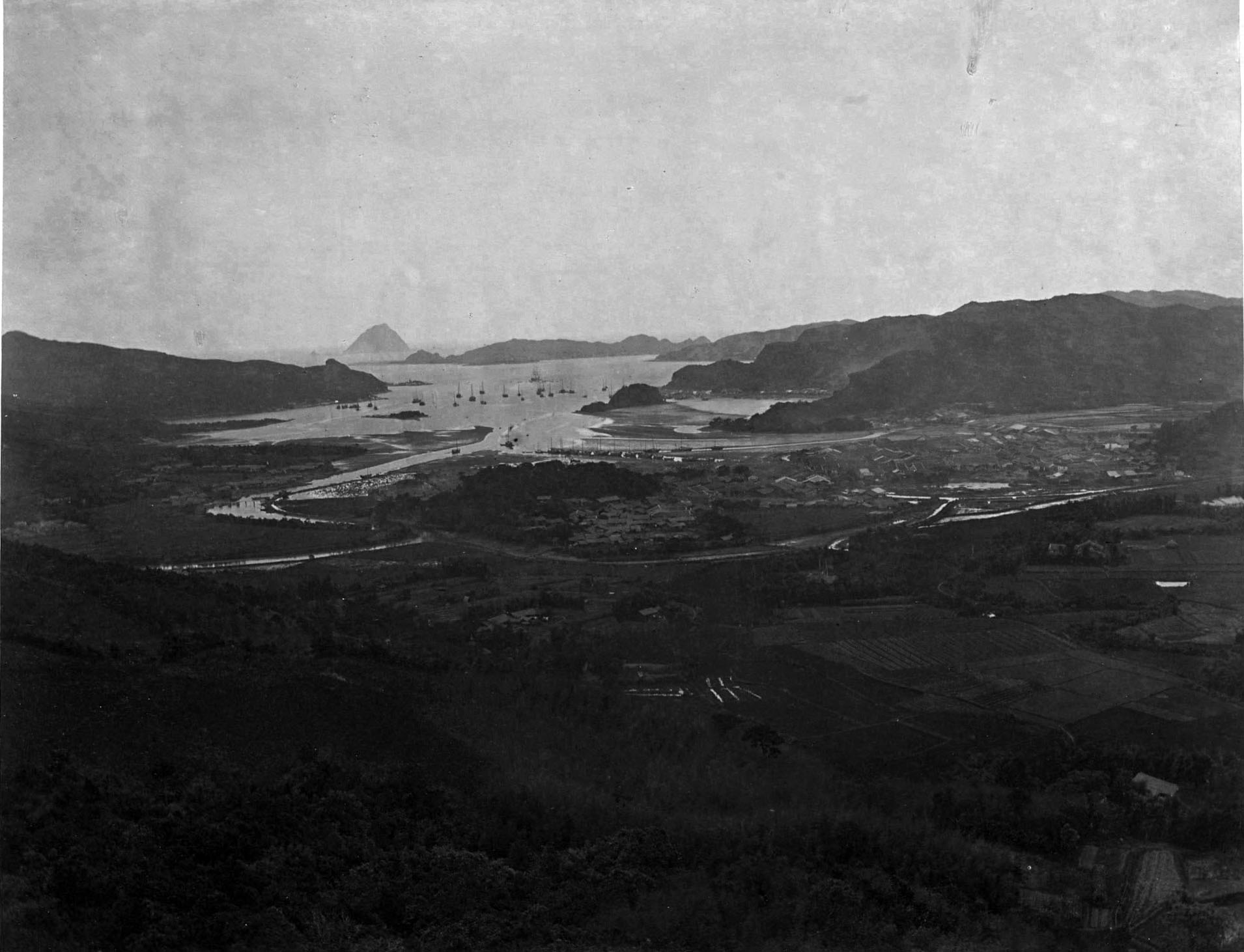
Keelung and the harbor was seriously affected by the earthquake. It sustained minor damage from the tsunami. Photographed sometime between 1860 and 1890.

== Tectonic setting ==
Taiwan is situated on a complex convergent boundary between the Eurasian plate and the Philippine Sea plate. Off the northeastern coast of the island, the Philippine Sea plate subducts northwards beneath the Ryukyu Islands (on the overriding Eurasian plate) along the Ryukyu Trench. To the south of the island, oceanic crust of the Eurasian plate subducts beneath eastwards the Philippine Sea plate along the Manila Trench. Taiwan lies at the junction of the two subduction zones, on the edge of the Asian continental margin (Eurasian plate), where the northwest–southeast convergence rate is estimated to be 7 cm/year. Continental collision occurs due to convergence of the Asian continental crust with continental crust of the Philippine Sea plate on the island. Continental crust of the Eurasian plate is being subducted beneath the island, forming east-dipping thrust faults.

== Geology ==
Multiple studies have been conducted to identify the source of the earthquake and subsequent tsunami. The moment (M_{w}) and local (M_{L}) magnitudes have been estimated to be 7.0 and 6.8, respectively. Due to the unusually large tsunami, several studies have suggested a submarine landslide or an eruption of the nearby Tatun Volcanic Group was the source of the tsunami.

The lack of historical documentation of the tsunami effects made identifying the fault difficult. Academics have associated the earthquake with a rupture along the Shanchiao Fault, a northeast–southwest trending normal fault. The fault runs onshore from the Taipei area to Jinshan for a length of 40 km (25 mi), and further extends offshore for another 50 km (31 mi). The fault dips towards the southeast at varying angles of 80° onshore to 62° offshore. It was also associated with an earthquake and tsunami in 1694. The Jinshan area formed due to rifting during the Quaternary.

In a 2017 study by Sugawara and others, modelling of the earthquake suggest a 7.24 M_{w} event with coseismic slip of 6 meters was required to reproduce the tsunami heights reported. The modelled earthquake involved a rupture on the onshore and offshore segments. An earlier study (2016) by Cheng and others estimated a 40 km (25 mi) rupture offshore at a depth of 10 km (6.2 mi) was consistent with the seismic intensity and tsunami reports. The modelled earthquake had a M_{w} of 7.0 and an epicenter located at 25.34°N 121.91°E.

== Earthquake ==
The earthquake occurred at 09:00 or 10:00 local time and produced shaking that lasted 15–30 seconds. In Taipei's Shilin District, many streets were damaged. Buildings collapsed in the city, killing hundreds. Major landslides occurred between Taipei and Keelung, demolishing villages. A large landslide measuring 600–700 m (2,000–2,300 ft) in length was reported at Huangzuishan. The landslide carved a gorge and hot sulfur-laced water flowed. Fissures formed and closed in the ground. More than half the number of homes in Jinshan collapsed. At a beach in Huanggang, hot springs erupted to a height of 9 m (30 ft). One person was killed and many were injured in Huangku when a hot spring erupted from a field. Water from the spring formed a large pond that still exists. Heavy damage was reported at Keelung where collapses buried several hundred residents. In Tamsui, homes collapsed, killing 30, and a British merchant warehouse was extensively damaged. At a nearby town, not far from Tamsui, 150 deaths occurred. An estimated 400 people were killed near the coast. The earthquake also killed more than 300 buffaloes and pigs due to collapses. Land subsidence by between 3 m (9.8 ft) and 7 m (23 ft) was estimated.

== Tsunami ==
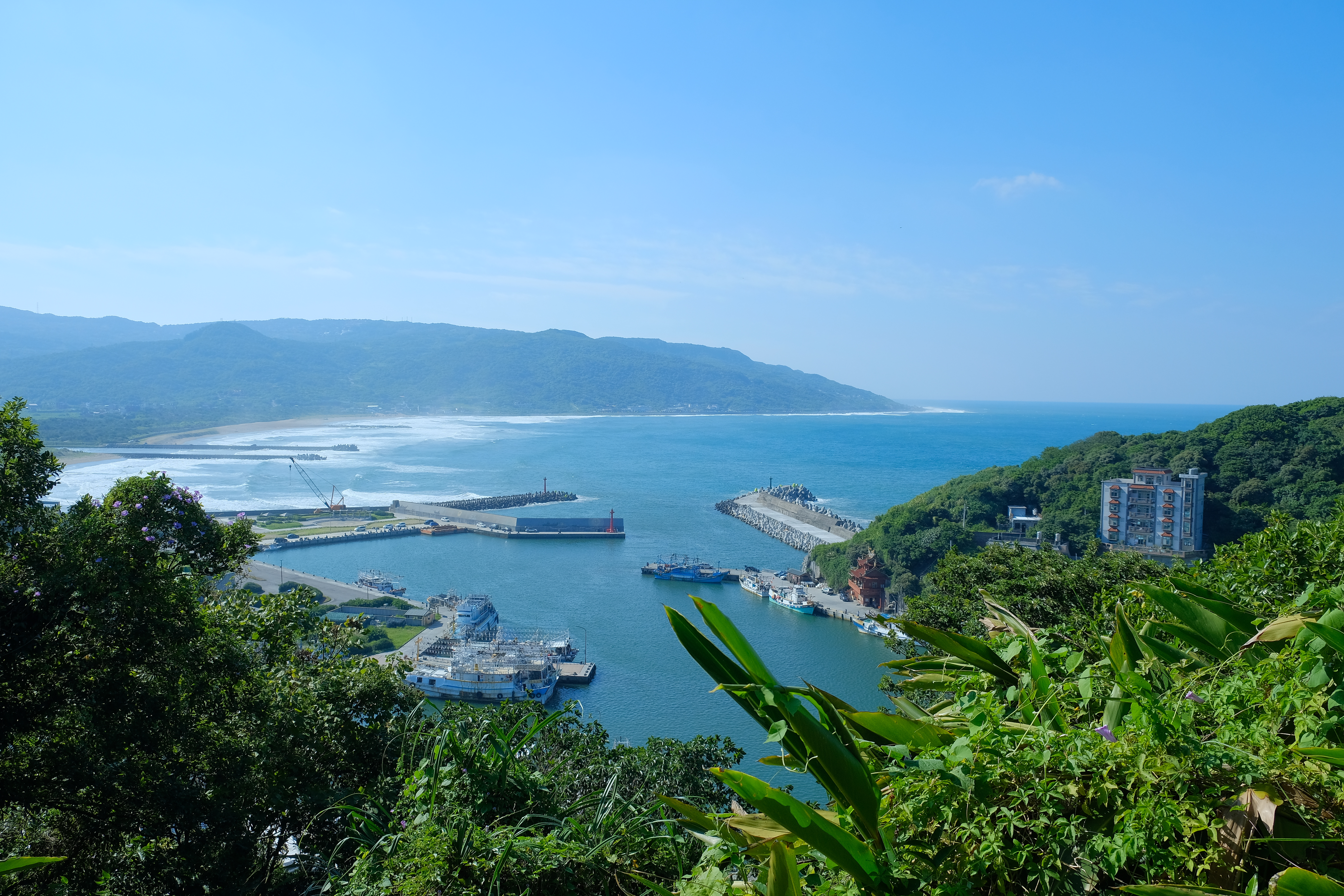
The coast of Huanggang was inundated by a tsunami up to 7 meters high. The trace of the Shanchiao Fault is located at the base of the hills.

Seawater receded approximately five minutes after the earthquake and 25 minutes later, exposed the seafloor by 500 m (1,600 ft). The tsunami struck at 11:00 local time, killed between 70 and 80 people in Jinshan. Tsunami victims were also reported at Yilan and Hualien. Many were killed after they went to the coast to collect fishes after the water receded. Over 100 were injured. A reported tsunami height of 6–7 m (20–23 ft) was observed at Huanggang and Shuiwei. Several Chinese junks were beached and pushed further inland while others sunk. At the harbour in Keelung, the tsunami was 1.75–2.05 m (5 ft 9 in – 6 ft 9 in). The waves destroyed 200 homes. A run-up of over 15 m (49 ft) was estimated at Jinbaoli Old Street and Badouzi. The high run-up at Jinbaoli Old Street was due to a river which allowed waves from the sea to flow upstream. Tsunami damage at Keelung was minimal and only affected the immediate coastal parts of the city. Waves were reported on Heping Island and Tongpan Island. A tsunami deposit was found 6 m (20 ft) above sea level on Heping Island. A 2016 study in Jinshan found tsunami deposits up to 800 m (2,600 ft) inland. An unusual tide was observed at Hangzhou while at the Yangtze River, the water level fell 1.35 m (4 ft 5 in) before rising 1.65 m (5 ft 5 in) in 48 hours. These observations are believed to be the effects of the tsunami.

== Volcanic eruption ==
A report of a submarine eruption at the time of the earthquake and tsunami was vaguely described and published in 1917. It is thought to be the only instance of an earthquake, tsunami and eruption occurring at the same time in the region. The eruption occurred off the northeast coast of the island but nature of it is unknown.

== See also ==
- List of historical earthquakes
- List of earthquakes in Taiwan
