= 1068 Near East earthquakes =

Series of earthquakes in the Arabian Peninsula and Palestine

1068 Near East earthquake
- Location within Egypt
- Local date: 18 March and 29 May 1068
- Local time: Morning
- Magnitude: ≥M_{w} 7.0
- Epicenter: 29.5°N 34.95°E
- Areas affected: Near East
- Total damage: Extreme
- Max. intensity: MMI IX (Violent)
- Casualties: ~20,000

Two major earthquakes occurred in the Near East on 18 March and 29 May, AD 1068. The two earthquakes are often amalgamated by contemporary sources. The first earthquake had its epicentre somewhere in the northwestern part of the Arabian Peninsula around Tabuk, while the second was most damaging in the city of Ramla in Palestine, some 500 km to the northwest.

The March earthquake affected the southern portion of the Dead Sea Transform (DST) fault system. The combined events were responsible for an estimated 20,000 deaths, of which some 15,000 occurred in Ramla alone, and caused damage throughout Greater Syria, including Palestine, where a tsunami devastated the Mediterranean coast, in Egypt and the Arabian Peninsula, and in areas to the east along the Euphrates such as al-Rahba and Kufa. Other strong earthquakes have occurred in the southern portion of the DST throughout history, impacting the wider region.

== Geological setting ==
The Dead Sea Transform (DST) is a 1,000 km (620 mi) transform fault that spans from the Red Sea in the south to the East Anatolian Fault in Turkey to the north. The southern extent of the DST is known as the Wadi Araba fault (after the Arabah valley). This portion of the DST runs 160 kilometers (99 mi) from north of Aqaba/Eilat to south of the Dead Sea and has a slip rate of 4 mm ±2 mm per year. The temporal pattern of large events has not been clarified yet, with only four well-documented large earthquakes reported in the Araba valley over the last few thousands of years occurring in 1068, 1212, 1293 and 1458 CE.

In 1998, Zilberman thought to locate the epicentre of the 1068 event at the Avrona playa, i.e. in the southern part of the Arava Valley. Ambraseys (2005) separates between a March event with the epicentre near Tabuk, and a May event closer to Ramla.

== Effects ==
The earthquake's effects were seen from as far north as Banias at the southern foot of Mount Hermon, to the Hejaz region of modern-day Saudi Arabia. The ancient city of Ayla, located at the northern end of the Gulf of Aqaba where modern Aqaba stands today, was destroyed. Palaeoseismic investigations have revealed more than 12 kilometers (7.5 mi) of fault rupture, beginning just north of Aqaba/Eilat, that were dated between 900 and 1,000 years before present. A magnitude of at least 7.0 was presented based on the reported damage and the extent of the observed fault breaks.

Alarm was caused at Saint Catherine's Monastery on the Sinai Peninsula, and there was damage in the ancient city of Tinnis in the Nile Delta, but not farther to the west along the Egyptian coast in Alexandria. In Cairo the only damage was to a corner of the Mosque of Amr ibn al-As in Fustat. Seismologist Nicholas Ambraseys described one account of the effects at Ramla as destructive and with a large loss of life (15,000 deaths, 200 of which were boys at a school). He also expounded on the effects to the north in Banias, where 100 were killed, and in Jerusalem, where the roof of the Dome of the Rock was "displaced and then returned to its former position". Those that were affected by the heavy damage in Ramla apparently migrated to Jerusalem, which indicated to Ambraseys that the effects there were otherwise minimal.

== Other events ==
In addition to the event in 1068, the southern portion of the DST has experienced three other historical events (all having an estimated magnitude of 6.5–7.0) with two in the northern section near the Dead Sea, and one closer to Aqaba. The event in 1212 caused significant damage to towns in the Arabah Valley as well as the destruction of a church on the Sinai Peninsula. In 1293, near the southern portion of the Dead Sea, an earthquake destroyed three towers of a castle and caused damage between the Dead Sea and Gaza. In 1458, another event again affected the southern Dead Sea area, this time causing a 2.2 m (7 ft 3 in) left-lateral offset at Qasr at-Tilah ("Tilah Castle", a Roman or Early Byzantine square fort, ca. 25 km south of the Dead Sea). The fort was built across the fault and the building that housed the water tank sustained the displacement.

== See also ==
- List of earthquakes in Egypt
- List of earthquakes in the Levant
- List of historical earthquakes
- Ramla, regional capital destroyed in 1068 that never recovered
