= List of historical earthquakes =

This is a list of historical earthquakes.

Historical earthquakes are significant earthquakes that occurred before the early 20th century. These events are primarily documented through written sources, observations of shaking objects or animal behavior, religious beliefs (e.g., "God's punishment") or palaeoseismological techniques. Due to the lack of instrumental recordings, there is often significant uncertainty in the locations, magnitudes, and dates of these earthquakes. The number of deaths is also often uncertain, especially for older events.

Unless otherwise noted, times are local time and magnitudes use the moment magnitude scale (M_{w}).

== Pre-11th century ==
Date	Time	Event	Magnitude	Deaths	Location	Comments	Sources
c. 1920 BC		Jishi Gorge Earthquake			Now China	The earthquake resulted in the Jishi Gorge Outburst Flood	
c. 1780 BC		Mount Tai earthquake			Now China		Bamboo Annals
479 BC		479 BC Potidaea earthquake	7 M_{s}		Greece	Earthquake followed by a sea withdrawal and large wave (likely a tsunami) that reportedly drowned Persian soldiers during the siege of Potidaea	
464 BC		464 BC Sparta earthquake	7.2 M_{s}	up to 20,000	Greece	Led to helot uprising and strained relations with Athens as a factor in the Peloponnesian War	
373 BC					Greece	Resulting tsunami destroyed the city of Helike	
226 BC		226 BC Rhodes earthquake			Greece	Destroyed the Colossus of Rhodes, city of Kameiros	
60 BC			8.5		Lusitania (now Portugal)	Caused tsunami	
17 C	At night	AD 17 Lydia earthquake			Lydia (now Turkey)	Destroyed 13 cities in Asia Minor	Tacitus and Pliny the Elder
13 December 115		115 Antioch earthquake	7.5 M_{s}	~260,000	Roman Syria (now Turkey)		
29 April 801		801 Apennine earthquake	5.4 M_{e}		Papal States (now Italy)	Rome greatly damaged; also felt in Spoleto	
24 November 847		847 Damascus earthquake	7.3 M_{w}	70,000	Abbasid Caliphate (now Syria)		
December 856				45,000	Byzantine Empire (now Greece)		
22 December 856		856 Damghan earthquake	7.9 M_{s}	200,000	Abbasid Caliphate (now Iran)	City of Qumis (Hecatompylos) partially destroyed with 45,096 casualties reported; aftershocks continued for about one year	
13 July 869		869 Jōgan earthquake	8.6–9	~1,000	Japan		
23 March 893		893 Ardabil earthquake	5.3–6	150,000	Armenia (now Iran)	Regarded as "fake earthquake" due to misunderstanding of original Armenian sources for the 893 Dvin event (below)	
28 December 893	00:00 (midnight)	893 Dvin earthquake	5.3–6 or ≥7	30,000	Armenia	Later wrongly located in India	

== 11th–16th centuries ==
Date	Time	Event	Magnitude	Fatalities	Location	Comments	Sources
December 1033		1033 Jordan Valley earthquake	7.3	70,000	Jordan Valley (now Israel)	Caused tsunami	
December 1037				22,391	China		
August 12, 1042			7.2	50,000	Syria		
March 18, 1068		1068 Near East earthquake	7.0+	20,000	Near East (now Syria)		
October 11, 1138		1138 Aleppo earthquake	7.1	230,000	Syria		
September 30, 1139		1139 Ganja earthquake	7.7 M_{LH}	230,000–300,000	Azerbaijan	Resulted in total destruction of Ganja	
August 12, 1157	08:15	1157 Hama earthquake	7.4 M_{s}	8,000	Syria	Largest in sequence of earthquakes from late 1156 to early 1159	
February 4, 1169		1169 Sicily earthquake	7.3 M_{s}	15,000	Sicily (now Italy)		
June 29, 1170	06:29	1170 Syria earthquake	7.7	30,000-105,000	Syria	5,000–80,000 in Aleppo; 25,000 in Hama	Numerous Crusader-era sources
July 5, 1201 and/or May 20, 1202		1202 Syria earthquake	7.6 M_{s}	1,100,000	Levant (now Syria)	Fatalities include deaths from subsequent famine and disease	
May 11, 1222	06:15	1222 Cyprus earthquake	7.0–7.5		Cyprus	Damage in Paphos, Limassol and Nicosia	
1269		1269 Cilicia earthquake	7.22±0.46	60,000	Cilicia (now Turkey)		
September 27, 1290		1290 Zhili earthquake	6.8 M_{s}	100,000	Zhili (now China)		
May 26, 1293		1293 Kamakura earthquake	7.1	23,024	Japan		
August 8, 1303	06:00	1303 Crete earthquake	8	≤10,000	Crete (now Greece)	Resulting tsunami devastated Alexandria, Egypt	
September 25, 1303		1303 Hongdong earthquake	7.2–7.6	170,000, 200,000+, or 270,000	China	Destroyed Taiyuan and Pingyang	
January 1, 1341			6		Crimea (now Ukraine)		
January 25, 1348	15:00	1348 Friuli earthquake	6.63±0.10	10,000	Italy	Felt in Carinthia and Styria. Deadly earthquake	
August 24, 1356		1356 Lisbon earthquake	8.5		Portugal		
October 18, 1356		1356 Basel earthquake	6.0–7.1	1,000	Switzerland		
May 21, 1382		1382 Dover Straits earthquake	6.0 M_{s}		England (now United Kingdom)	"Earthquake Synod" that struck during synod called to condemn heresy of John Wycliffe with some viewing event as portentous	
February 2, 1428		1428 Catalonia earthquake	6.7 M_{e}	"thousands"	Catalonia (now Spain)	Sometimes called "terratrèmol de la candelera" because it took place during Candlemas	
December 5 & 30, 1456		1456 Central Italy earthquakes	7.2	30,000–70,000	Kingdom of Naples (now Italy)	Largest and most widespread earthquake on Italian Peninsula with another 7.0 shock on December 30	
May 3, 1481	03:00	1481 Rhodes earthquake	7.1 M_{s}	30,000	Rhodes (now Greece)	Largest in series of earthquakes that lasted 10 months	
September 20, 1498	08:00	1498 Meiō earthquake	8.6 M_{s}	31,000	Honshu (now Japan)		
June 6, 1505		1505 Lo Mustang earthquake	8.2–8.8		Nepal	Killed approximately 30% of Nepalese population	
September 10, 1509	22:00	1509 Constantinople earthquake	7.2±0.3 M_{s}	10,000	Ottoman Empire (now Turkey)		
January 26, 1531	04:00	1531 Lisbon earthquake	6.4–7.1	30,000	Portugal		
1548		1548 Bengal earthquake	7.1+		Bengal (now Bangladesh)	Felt over large area with water and mud ejected from ground due to liquefaction causing extensive damage	
January 23, 1556		1556 Shaanxi earthquake	7.0-8.0	830,000+	China	Deadliest earthquake in recorded history	USGS
November 16–17, 1570	03:00	1570 Ferrara earthquake	5.5 M_{I}	171	Italy		Azariah de Rossi's "Kol Elohim"
December 16, 1575	14:30	1575 Valdivia earthquake	8.5 M_{s}		Chile		
June 11, 1585		1585 Aleutian Islands earthquake	9.25		Alaska (now United States)	Moderate tsunami struck Sanriku coast of Japan on June 11; Hawaiian oral traditions report deaths after tsunami-like event; paleotsunami evidence in Hawaiian Islands consistent with large 16th-century tsunami with modelling of 9.25 Aleutian Islands earthquake	
January 18, 1586	23:00	1586 Tenshō earthquake	7.9 M_{JMA}	8,000	Chūbu region (now Japan)	Caused tsunami	

== 17th century ==
Date	Time	Event	Magnitude	Fatalities	Location	Comments	Sources
November 24, 1604	13:30	1604 Arica earthquake	8.7–9.0	100+	Chile	Created large tsunami that caused widespread damage to Southern Peru	
February 3, 1605	20:00	1605 Keichō earthquake	7.9 M_{s}	"thousands"	Shikoku (now Japan)		
July 13, 1605		1605 Guangdong earthquake	7.5 M_{s}	"several thousand"	Hainan (now China)		
December 11, 1611	10:30	1611 Sanriku earthquake	8.1 M_{s}	5,000	Sanriku (now Japan)		
October 25, 1622		1622 North Guyuan earthquake	7.0 M_{s}	12,000	Ningxia (now China)		
May 11, 1624	03:00–04:00	1624 Fez earthquake	6.0	"thousands"	Morocco		
August 1, 1629		1629 Banda Sea earthquake	8.2–8.8	0	Banda Sea (now Indonesia)		
March 27, 1638		1638 Calabrian earthquakes	7.1	9,581–30,000	Calabria (now Italy)	Sequence of four earthquakes	
February 5, 1641	At night	1641 Tabriz earthquake	6.8 M_{s}	12,613–30,000	Iran		
February 5, 1663	17:30	1663 Charlevoix earthquake	7.3–7.9	0	Quebec (now Canada)	Landslides were most significant feature	
April 6, 1667		1667 Dubrovnik earthquake	7.2	3,000	Croatia		
November 25, 1667		1667 Shamakhi earthquake	6.9 M_{s}	80,000	Azerbaijan		
July 25, 1668		1668 Shandong earthquake	8.5	42,578	Shandong (now China)	Largest recorded earthquake in East China	
August 17, 1668		1668 North Anatolia earthquake	8	8,000	Anatolia (now Turkey)	Largest recorded earthquake in Turkey	USGS
February 17, 1674	19:30	1674 Ambon earthquake and megatsunami	6.8	2,347	Ambon (now Indonesia)	Tsunami up to 100 meters high; first and largest documented tsunami in Indonesia	
November 4, 1677	20:00	1677 Bōsō earthquake	8.3–8.6	569	Bōsō Peninsula (now Japan)		
October 20, 1687	11:30	1687 Peru earthquake	8.2	5,000	Peru		
June 5, 1688		1688 Sannio earthquake	7	10,000	Sannio (now Italy)	Destroyed Cerreto Sannita and Guardia Sanframondi, heavily damaged Benevento	
September 13, 1692	11:00	1692 Salta earthquake	7.0	13	Salta Province (now Argentina)	Destroyed village of Talavera del Esteco	
June 7, 1692	11:43	1692 Jamaica earthquake	7	2,000+	Jamaica		
January 11, 1693		1693 Sicily earthquake	7.5	60,000	Sicily (now Italy)		
September 5, 1694	11:40	1694 Irpinia–Basilicata earthquake	6.9	6,000	Irpinia (now Italy)		
May 18, 1695	12:00	1695 Linfen earthquake	7.8	52,600–176,365	Shanxi (now China)		
January 5, 1699	Early morning	1699 Java earthquake	7.4–8.0	128+	Java (now Indonesia)		

== 18th century ==
Date	Time	Event	Magnitude	Fatalities	Location	Comments	Sources
January 26, 1700	21:00	1700 Cascadia earthquake	8.7–9.2		Cascadia subduction zone (now United States)	Source of "Orphan Tsunami" which struck Japan hours later (Satake et al., 1996)	USGS
January 14, 1703	18:00 UTC	1703 Norcia earthquake	6.7 M_{L}	6,240–9,761	Italy	First of three 1703 Apennine earthquakes	
January 16, 1703	13:30 UTC	1703 Montereale earthquake	6.2 M_{L}		Italy	Second of three 1703 Apennine earthquakes	
February 2, 1703	11:05 UTC	1703 L'Aquila earthquake	6.7 M_{L}	2,500–5,000	Italy	Third of three 1703 Apennine earthquakes	
December 31, 1703	02:00	1703 Genroku earthquake	8.2 M_{s}	5,233–200,000	Kantō region (now Japan)	Caused major tsunami	
November 3, 1706	13:00	1706 Abruzzo earthquake	6.6–6.84	2,400	Abruzzo (now Italy)	Also known as the Maiella earthquake	
October 28, 1707	13:45	1707 Hōei earthquake	8.6 M_{L}	4,900–21,000	Chūbu region (now Japan)	Caused major tsunami	
October 14, 1709	Morning	1709 Zhongwei earthquake	7.5 M_{s}	2,032	China		
February 3, 1716		1716 Algiers earthquake	7.0 M_{w}	20,000	Algeria	Largest of a seismic sequence which began in February and ended in May 1716	
June 19, 1718		1718 Tongwei–Gansu earthquake	7.5 M_{s}	73,000	Gansu (now China)		
April 26, 1721		1721 Tabriz earthquake	7.7 M_{s}	8,000–250,000	Iran		
July 8, 1730	08:45	1730 Valparaíso earthquake	9.1–9.3		Chile	Caused major tsunami	
September 30, 1730	10:00	1730 Haidian earthquake	6.5		China		
November 29, 1732	08:40	1732 Irpinia earthquake	6.6	1,940	Irpinia (now Italy)		
October 17, 1737	03:00	1737 Kamchatka earthquake	9.0–9.3	"many"	Kamchatka Peninsula (now Russia)	Caused major tsunami	
January 3, 1739	18:00 UTC	1739 Yinchuan–Pingluo earthquake	7.1–7.6	50,000	Ningxia (now China)		
October 28, 1746	22:30	1746 Lima–Callao earthquake	8.6–8.8	5,941	Peru		
May 25, 1751	01:00	1751 Concepción earthquake	8.5	~65	Chile	Caused major tsunami	USGS
June 7, 1755		1755 Kashan earthquake	5.9	1,200-40,000	Iran		
November 1, 1755	10:16	1755 Lisbon earthquake	7.7–9.0	40,000-50,000	Portugal	Also known as the Great Lisbon earthquake; caused major tsunami	USGS
November 18, 1755	04:30	1755 Cape Ann earthquake	5.9	0	United States	Largest earthquake in Massachusetts history	
November 27, 1755		1755 Meknes earthquake	6.5–7.0	15,000	Morocco		
October 30, 1759	04:00	1759 Near East earthquakes	6.6 M_{s}	2,000	Israel	First of two 1759 Near East earthquakes; considered a foreshock of November, 25, 1759 event (below)	
November 25, 1759	19:30	1759 Near East earthquakes	7.4 M_{s}	≤20,000	Ottoman Syria (now Syria)	Second of two 1759 Near East earthquakes	
March 31, 1761	12:01	1761 Lisbon earthquake	8.5 M_{s}	25	Portugal	Caused tsunami	
April 2, 1762	17:00	1762 Arakan earthquake	8.5–8.8	200+	Bay of Bengal (now Bangladesh)	Caused tsunami	
June 28, 1763	05:28	1763 Komárom earthquake	6.2–6.5	83	Hungary		
May 22, 1766	05:10	1766 Istanbul earthquake	7.1 M_{s}	4,000	Turkey		
October 21, 1766	04:30	1766 Southeastern Caribbean earthquake	6.5–7.5 M_{s}		Trinidad and Tobago	Destroyed Spanish colonial capital of San Jose, Trinidad (now St. Joseph)	
June 3, 1770	19:15	1770 Port-au-Prince earthquake	7.5	250+	Haiti	Caused tsunami	
July 29, 1773		1773 Guatemala earthquake	7.5 M_{i}	500–600	Guatemala		
December 15, 1778	Just before dawn	1778 Kashan earthquake	6.2 M_{s}	>8,000	Iran		
January 8, 1780		1780 Tabriz earthquake	7.4 M_{s}	50,000	Iran		
February 4–5, 1783; March 28, 1783	12:00	1783 Calabrian earthquakes	6.9	32,000-50,000	Calabria (now Italy)	First in a sequence of five earthquakes ≥5.9 to hit Calabria in less than two months	
June 1, 1786	04:00	1786 Kangding-Luding earthquake	7.75	100,000	Sichuan (now China)	Triggered a landslide that blocked the Dadu river; the collapse of the dam during an aftershock and subsequent flood caused most of the casualties	
March 28, 1787	11:30	1787 New Spain earthquake	8.6	11+	Oaxaca (now Mexico)		
February 4, 1797	12:30	1797 Riobamba earthquake	7.3	41,000	Ecuador		
February 10, 1797		1797 Sumatra earthquake	8.4	300	Sumatra (now Indonesia)		

== 19th century ==
Date	Time	Event	Magnitude	Fatalities	Location	Comments	Sources
October 26, 1802	10:55	1802 Vrancea earthquake	7.9	3 in Bucharest	Romania		
February 16, 1810	22:15	1810 Crete earthquake	7.5	2,000	Greece		
December 16, 1811	02:15	1811–1812 New Madrid earthquakes	7.5 M		United States	Followed by 7.0 M "Dawn" aftershock at 07:15	USGS
January 23, 1812	09:15	1811–1812 New Madrid earthquakes	7.3 M		United States		USGS
February 7, 1812	03:45	1811–1812 New Madrid earthquakes	7.5 M		United States	(Johnston, 1996)	USGS
March 26, 1812	16:37	1812 Caracas earthquake	7.7 M	15,000–20,000	Venezuela		
December 8, 1812	07:00	1812 San Juan Capistrano earthquake	6.9 M_{la}–7.5	40	Alta California (now United States)	Also known as the Capistrano earthquake or the Wrightwood earthquake; destroyed "The Great Stone Church" at Mission San Juan Capistrano	
December 21, 1812	11:00	1812 Ventura earthquake	7.2	2	United States	Also known as the Santa Barbara earthquake	Southern California Earthquake Data Center
June 16, 1819	18:45–18:50	1819 Rann of Kutch earthquake	7.7–8.2	>1,543	India	Formed an 80 km long ridge, the Allah Bund ("Dam of God")	
June 2, 1823	08:00	1823 Hawaii earthquake	7.0-7.5 M		Kingdom of Hawaii (now United States)	Also known as the Kaʻū earthquake	
June 6, 1833		1833 Kodiak earthquake	7.5		Russian America (now United States)		
August 26, 1833	22:58	1833 Bihar–Nepal earthquake	7.6–7.9	500	Nepal		
November 25, 1833	22:00	1833 Sumatra earthquake	8.8–9.2	"numerous"	Sumatra (now Indonesia)	Subsequent tsunami devastated the southwest coast of Sumatra from Pariaman to Bengkulu	
June 1836		1836 Hayward earthquake			Alta California (now United States)	Probably misreported in 1868 following the 1838 San Andreas earthquake	
January 1, 1837	16:00	1837 Galilee earthquake	6.5	6,000-7,000	Ottoman Syria (now Israel)	Also known as the Safed earthquake	
June 1838		1838 San Andreas earthquake	7.0		Alta California (now United States)		
January 11, 1839	06:00	1839 Martinique earthquake	7.5	300	Martinique (now France)		
March 23, 1839	04:00	1839 Ava earthquake	8.2	300-400	Konbaung dynasty (now Myanmar)	Also known as the Great Innwa earthquake	
January 4, 1843	Evening	1843 Marked Tree earthquake	6.0		United States		
February 8, 1843	10:37	1843 Guadeloupe earthquake	8.5 M_{uk}	1,500–5,000	Guadeloupe (now France)	Severe destruction in Basse-Terre and Pointe-à-Pitre; tsunami reported locally	
April 25, 1843	06:00	1843 Tokachi earthquake	8.0 M_{JMA}	91	Japan	Created large tsunami	
May 8, 1847	21:30	1847 Zenkoji earthquake	7.4 M_{s}	≥8,600	Japan	Also known as the Nagano earthquake	
November 26, 1852	07:40	1852 Banda Sea earthquake	7.5	60+	Banda Sea (now Indonesia)		
December 23, 1854	09:00	1854 Tōkai earthquake	8.4 M_{L}	>2,000	Japan	Also known as the Ansei Tokai earthquake	
December 24, 1854	16:00	1854 Nankai earthquake	8.4 M_{L}	>3,000	Japan	Caused large tsunami	
January 23, 1855	21:11	1855 Wairarapa earthquake	8.2	7-9	New Zealand	Largest earthquake in New Zealand recorded history	
November 11, 1855	22:00	1855 Edo earthquake	7.0 M_{s}	7,000-10,000	Edo (now Japan)	Also known as the Ansei Edo earthquake	
October 12, 1856	02:38 or 02:45	1856 Heraklion earthquake	7.7–8.3	600+	Crete (now Greece)	Also known as the Great Crete earthquake	
January 9, 1857	16:24	1857 Fort Tejon earthquake	7.9	2	United States		
December 16, 1857	22:15	1857 Basilicata earthquake	7.0	19,000	Italy	Also known as the Great Neapolitan earthquake	USGS
February 16, 1861		1861 Sumatra earthquake	8.5	"several thousand"	Sumatra (now Indonesia)	Caused large tsunami	
March 20, 1861	23:30	1861 Mendoza earthquake	7.2 M_{s}	6,000-12,000	Argentina		INPRES
April 24, 1867	14:30	1867 Manhattan, Kansas earthquake	5.1 M_{fa}		United States	Largest earthquake in Kansas recorded history	
June 10, 1867	04:20-04:30	1867 Java earthquake	7.8	≤700	Java (now Indonesia)	Caused extensive destruction in Yogyakarta and surrounding areas	
November 18, 1867	14:45	1867 Virgin Islands earthquake and tsunami	7.5 M_{s}	>50	Danish West Indies (now U.S. Virgin Islands)	Strong earthquake followed by a local tsunami	
December 18, 1867	09:00	1867 Keelung earthquake	7.0	580	Taiwan (now Taiwan)	At 15 m, thought to be the only destructive tsunami in Taiwan	
April 3, 1868	02:25	1868 Hawaii earthquake	7.9 M_{I}	77	United States	(Klein and Wright, 2000)	USGS
August 13, 1868	16:45	1868 Arica earthquake	8.5-9.3	25,000	Chile	Okal et al. (2006) gives upper end magnitude	USGS
October 21, 1868	15:53	1868 Hayward earthquake	6.8 M_{I}	30	United States	Known as the "Great San Francisco earthquake" prior to the 1906 San Francisco earthquake	USGS
May 10, 1877	21:16	1877 Iquique earthquake	8.5 M_{s}	2,385	Chile	Caused large tsunami	USGS
November 9, 1880	07:33	1880 Zagreb earthquake	6.3 M_{L}	1	Croatia		
April 3, 1881	13:40	1881 Chios earthquake	6.5	7,866	Greece		
December 31, 1881	07:49	1881 Nicobar Islands earthquake	7.9	0	India	Caused tsunami	
September 7, 1882	03:50	1882 Panama earthquake	7.9–8.3 M_{s}	250	Panama	Caused tsunami; largest earthquake in Panamanian history	
December 25, 1884	21:08	1884 Andalusian earthquake	6.7±	1,200	Spain	Heavy snow that followed caused further deaths	
August 27, 1886	23:27	1886 Peloponnese earthquake	6.8-7.3	326–600	Greece		
August 31, 1886	21:51	1886 Charleston earthquake	6.9–7.3	60	United States	Believed to be the largest earthquake ever to strike the US east coast	USGS
February 23, 1887	06:30	1887 Liguria earthquake	6.8–6.9	600–3,000	Italy	Severe damage along the Ligurian coast	
September 1, 1888	04:10	1888 North Canterbury earthquake	7.0–7.3 M		New Zealand		
July 28, 1889	23:40	1889 Kumamoto earthquake	6.3	20	Japan		
October 27, 1891	06:38	1891 Mino–Owari earthquake	8 M_{s}	7,273	Japan	Largest inland earthquake in Japan's recorded history	USGS
April 19, 1892	02:50	1892 Vacaville earthquake	6.4 M	1	United States	First of two 1892 Vacaville–Winters earthquakes	USGS
April 21, 1892	09:43	1892 Winters earthquake	6.2 M		United States	Second of two 1892 Vacaville–Winters earthquakes	USGS
November 17, 1893	19:30	1893 Quchan earthquake	6.6 M_{s}	18,000	Iran		
October 31, 1893	05:12	1893 Charleston earthquake	6.0–6.3 M_{s}	1	United States		
June 15, 1896	19:32	1896 Sanriku earthquake	8.5	22,000+	Japan	Caused large tsunamis	USGS
August 31, 1896	17:06	1896 Rikuu earthquake	7.2 M	209	Japan		
June 12, 1897	17:11	1897 Assam earthquake	8.0	1,542	British India (now India)	Also known as the "Great Indian earthquake"	
September 20, 1897	19:06 UTC	1897 Mindanao earthquakes	7.4 M_{s}		Philippines	First of two 1897 Mindanao earthquakes; caused tsunami	
September 21, 1897	05:12 UTC	1897 Mindanao earthquakes	7.5 M_{s}	13+	Philippines	Second of two 1897 Mindanao earthquakes; caused large tsunami	
September 4, 1899	21:41	1899 Yakutat Bay earthquakes	8.2		United States	First of two major 1899 Yakutat Bay earthquakes	
September 10, 1899	04:32	1899 Yakutat Bay earthquakes	8.1		United States	Second of two major 1899 Yakutat Bay earthquakes	
September 20, 1899	04:00	1899 Aydın–Denizli earthquake	6.5-7.1	1,117–1,470	Ottoman Empire (now Turkey)		NGDC
October 9, 1900	02:30-04:00	1900 Kodiak Island earthquake	8.3 M_{s}		United States		
October 29, 1900	04:30-04:45	1900 San Narciso earthquake	7.6-7.7	140	Venezuela		USGS

== See also ==
- Archaeoseismology
- Lists of 20th-century earthquakes
- Lists of 21st-century earthquakes
- List of tsunamis
- Lists of earthquakes
- List of megathrust earthquakes
- Paleoseismology
