= Apamea (Phrygia) =

Ancient city in Anatolia

Apamea Cibotus
- Location within Turkey
- 38°04′18″N 30°09′56″E
- Location: Turkey
- Region: Afyonkarahisar Province

Apamea Cibotus, Apamea ad Maeandrum (on the Maeander), Apamea or Apameia (Ancient Greek: Ἀπάμεια, romanized: Apámeia, Ancient Greek: κιβωτός, romanized: kibōtós) was an ancient city in Anatolia founded in the 3rd century BC by Antiochus I Soter, who named it after his mother Apama. It was in Hellenistic Phrygia, but became part of the Roman province of Pisidia. It was near, but on lower ground than, Celaenae (Kelainai).

== Geography ==
The site is now partly occupied by the city of Dinar (sometimes locally known also as Geyikler, "the gazelles," perhaps from a tradition of the Persian hunting-park, seen by Xenophon at Celaenae), which by 1911 was connected with İzmir by railway; there are considerable remains, including a theatre and a great number of important Graeco-Roman inscriptions. Strabo (p. 577) says, that the town lies at the source (ekbolais) of the Marsyas, and the river flows through the middle of the city, having its origin in the city, and being carried down to the suburbs with a violent and precipitous current it joins the Maeander after the latter is joined by the Orgas (called the Catarrhactes by Herodotus, vii. 26).

== History ==
=== Classical Age ===
The original inhabitants were residents of Celaenae who were compelled by Antiochus I Soter to move further down the river, where they founded the city of Apamea (Strabo, xii. 577). Antiochus the Great transplanted many Jews there. (Josephus, Ant. xii. 3, § 4). It became a seat of Seleucid power, and a centre of Graeco-Roman and Graeco-Hebrew civilization and commerce. There Antiochus the Great collected the army with which he met the Romans at Magnesia, and two years later the Treaty of Apamea between Rome and the Seleucid realm was signed there. After Antiochus' departure for the East, Apamea lapsed to the Pergamene kingdom and thence to Rome in 133 BC, but it was resold to Mithridates V of Pontus, who held it till 120 BC. After the Mithridatic Wars it became and remained a great centre for trade, largely carried on by resident Italians and by Jews. By order of Flaccus, a large amount of Jewish money – nearly 45 kilograms of gold – intended for the Temple in Jerusalem was confiscated in Apamea in the year 62 BC. In 84 BC Sulla made it the seat of a conventus, and it long claimed primacy among Phrygian cities. When Strabo wrote, Apamea was a place of great trade in the Roman province of Asia, next in importance to Ephesus. Its commerce was owing to its position on the great road to Cappadocia, and it was also the centre of other roads. When Cicero was proconsul of Cilicia, 51 BC, Apamea was within his jurisdiction (ad Fam. xiii. 67), but the dioecesis, or conventus, of Apamea was afterwards attached to Asia. Pliny the Elder enumerates six towns which belonged to the conventus of Apamea, and he observes that there were nine others of little note.

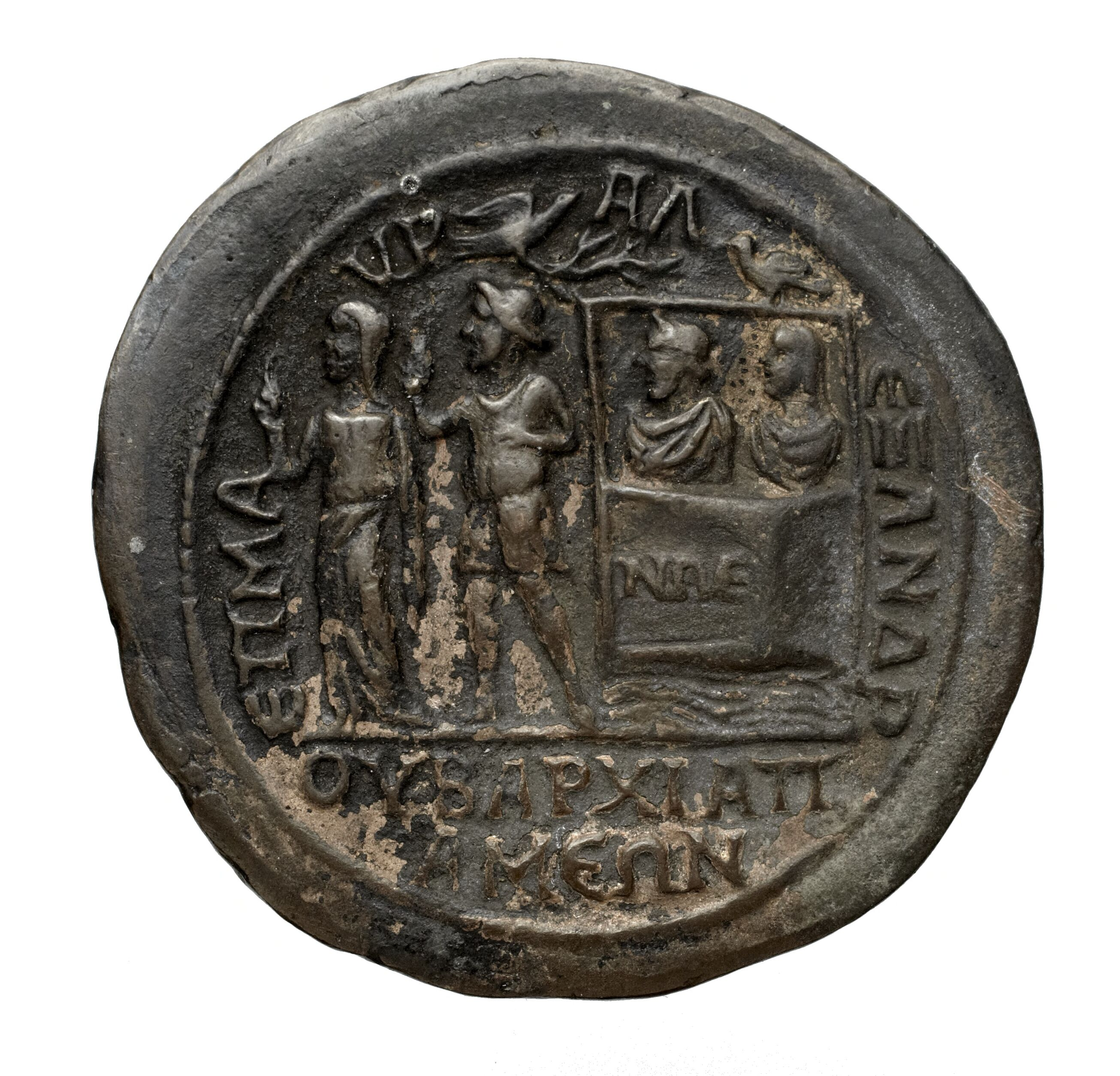
A coin of Kibotos depicting Noah's Ark

The city minted its own coins in antiquity. The name Cibotus appears on some coins of Apamea, and it has been proposed that it was called this due to the wealth that was collected in this great emporium; for kibôtos in Greek is a chest or coffer. Pliny (v. 29) says that it was first Celaenae, then Cibotus, and then Apamea; which cannot be quite correct, because Celaenae was a different place from Apamea, though near it. There possibly was previously a place on the site of Apamea with the name Cibotus.

The country about Apamea has been shaken by earthquakes, one of which is recorded as having happened in the time of Claudius (Tacit. Ann. xii. 58); and on this occasion the payment of taxes to the Romans was remitted for five years. Nicolaus of Damascus (Athen. p. 332) records a violent earthquake at Apamea at a previous date, during the Mithridatic Wars: lakes appeared where none were before, and rivers and springs; and many which existed before disappeared. Strabo (p. 579) speaks of this great catastrophe, and of other convulsions at an earlier period. The 92 BC Levant earthquake likely affected the area as well.

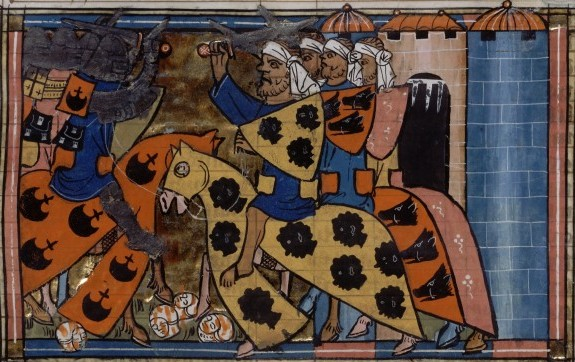
Battle of Kibitos, 13th century manuscript

Apamea continued to be a prosperous town under the Roman Empire. Its decline dates from the local disorganisation of the empire in the 3rd century AD; and though a bishopric, it was not an important military or commercial centre in Byzantine times. The Turks took it first in 1080, until it was reconquered by emperor John II Komnenos in the early 12th century. Apamea fell back under Turkish rule in the late 13th century, when the Byzantine frontier collapsed. For a long period it was one of the greatest cities of Asia Minor, commanding the Maeander road; but when the trade routes were diverted to Constantinople it rapidly declined, and its ruin was completed by an earthquake.

=== Apamea in Jewish tradition ===
Apamea is mentioned in the Talmud. The passages relating to witchcraft in Apamea (Ber. 62a) and to a dream in Apamea (Niddah, 30b) probably refer to the Apamea in Phrygia which was looked upon as a fabulously distant habitation. Similarly the much-discussed passage, Yeb. 115b, which treats of the journey of the exilarch Isaac, should also be interpreted to mean a journey from Corduene to Apamea in Phrygia; for if Apamea in Mesene were meant (Brüll's Jahrb. x. 145) it is quite impossible that the Babylonians should have had any difficulty in identifying the body of such a distinguished personage.

After 200 AD, a couple named Aurelius Rufus and Aurelia Tatiane set up a heroön in Apamea. Its inscription invokes the "Laws of the Jews" in a curse formula designed to prevent the tomb from being reused by others. The mid-third century AD coins of Apamea or Cibotus with scenes of Noah and his ark are among the earliest biblical scenes in Roman art.

=== Christian Apamea ===
Apamea Cibotus is enumerated by Hierocles among the episcopal cities of the Roman province of Pisidia. Lequien gives the names of nine of its bishops. The first is a Julianus of Apamea at the Maeander who, Eusebius records, was in about 253 reported by Alexander of Hierapolis (Phrygia) to have joined others in examining the claims of the Montanist Maximilla. The list of bishops from Pisidia who participated in the First Council of Nicaea (325) includes Tharsitius of Apamea. It also gives a Paulus of Apamea, but Lequien considers that in the latter case "Apamea" is a mistake for "Acmonia". A Bishop Theodulus of Apamea (who might, however, have been from Apamea in Bithynia) witnessed a will of Gregory of Nazianzus. Paulinus took part in the Council of Chalcedon (451) and was a signatory of the letter from the bishops of Pisidia to Emperor Leo I the Thracian concerning the killing in 457 of Proterius of Alexandria. In the early 6th century, Conon abandoned his bishopric of Apamea in Phrygia and became a military leader in a rebellion against Emperor Anastasius. The acts of the Second Council of Constantinople (553) were signed by "John by the mercy of God bishop of the city of Apamea in the province of Pisidia". Sisinnius of Apamea was one of the Pisidian bishops at the Second Council of Nicaea (787). The Council held at Constantinople in 879–880 was attended by two bishops of Apamea in Pisidia, one appointed by Patriarch Ignatius of Constantinople the other by Photios I of Constantinople.

Since it is no longer a residential diocese, Apamea Cibotus is today listed by the Catholic Church as a titular see.

== See also ==
- List of ancient Greek cities
