= 1796 Latakia earthquake =

Earthquake affecting Syria

- Location within Syria
- Local date: 26 April 1796
- Magnitude: M_{s} 6.8
- Depth: 20 km (12 mi)
- Epicenter: 36.527°N 37.956°E
- Max. intensity: EMS-98 IX (Destructive)
- Casualties: 1,500 fatalities

The 1796 Latakia earthquake struck present-day east coast of Syria on 26 April. The earthquake had an estimated surface-wave magnitude of 6.8 and maximum EMS-92 intensity of VIII–IX (Heavily damaging–Destructive). Damage in Latakia was heavy and there was an estimated 1,500 people killed.

== Impact ==
In Latakia, one-third of homes in the city were destroyed while the rest were damaged. Buildings, watchtowers and minarets collapsed. There were about 1,500 fatalities among the city's population of 5,000. A tobacco customs house in the port area collapsed, killing 400 people. Most houses were also destroyed in Jableh. The minaret of a mosque in the city collapsed. Many farmers living in villages outside the cities also died. The Margat and Al-Qadmus castles were totally destroyed. North of Latakia, in Bayırbucak and along the Nahr al-Kabir, many deaths occurred. Shaking was felt from Aleppo to Tripoli and Sidon. The earthquake was followed by coseismic coastal uplift.

== See also ==
- List of earthquakes in the Levant
- List of earthquakes in Turkey
