= 1138 Aleppo earthquake =

12th-century earthquake in Syria

- Location within Syria
- Local date: 11 October 1138
- Magnitude: M_{w} 7.1
- Epicenter: 36°13′N 37°10′E
- Casualties: 230,000 dead

The earthquake that struck Aleppo and the rest of northern Syria on 11 October 1138 was among the deadliest earthquakes in history. The earthquake, preceded by a smaller one on 10 October, caused damage and chaos to many places in the area around Aleppo. It is frequently listed as the third deadliest earthquake in history, following on from the Shensi and Tangshan earthquakes in China. However, the figure of 230,000 deaths reported by Ibn Taghribirdi in the fifteenth century is most likely based on a historical conflation of this earthquake with earthquakes in November 1137 on the Jazira plain and the large seismic event of 30 September 1139 in the Transcaucasian city of Ganja.

== Background ==
Aleppo is located along the northern part of the Dead Sea Transform system of geologic faults, which is a plate boundary separating the Arabian plate from the African plate. The earthquake was the beginning of the first of two intense sequences of earthquakes in the region: October 1138 to June 1139 and a much more intense and a later series from September 1156 to May 1159. The first sequence affected areas around Aleppo and the western part of the region of Edessa (modern Şanlıurfa, Turkey). During the second an area encompassing north-western Syria, northern Lebanon and the region of Antioch (modern Antakya, in southern Turkey) was subject to devastating quakes.

In the mid-twelfth century, northern Syria was a war-ravaged land. The Crusader states set up by Western Europeans, such as the Principality of Antioch, were in a state of constant armed conflict with the Muslim states of Northern Syria and the Jazeerah, principally Aleppo and Mosul.

== Geological setting ==
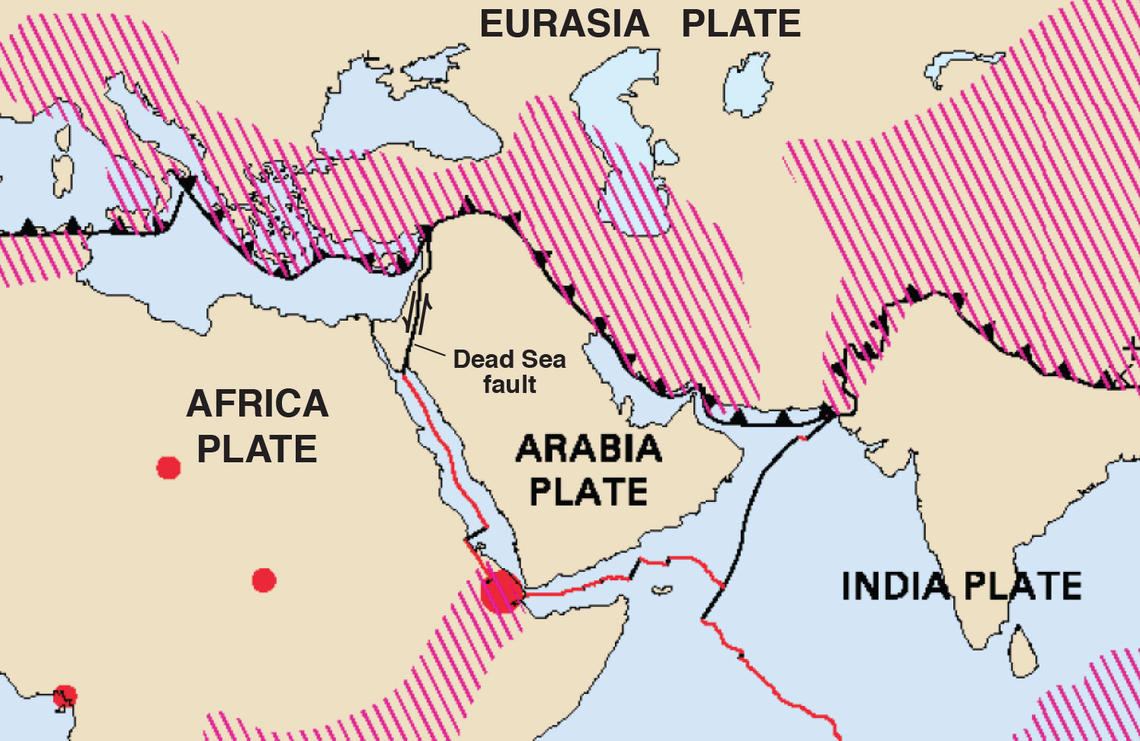
The Near East houses a triple junction between the Arabian, Eurasian, and African plates. This is responsible for most of the seismic, volcanic and orogenic activity in the region.

The Near East region sits on a triple junction between the Arabian, African, and Eurasian plates. As such, this is one of the most tectonically active regions in the world. The Arabian plate is subducting beneath the Eurasian plate causing the orogeny of the Caucasus Mountains and Anatolian plateau. Complementing the subduction zone along the north are divergent boundaries near the Red and Arabian Seas, as well as transform boundaries to the west along roughly along the coast of the Mediterranean Sea from the Sinai Peninsula to the Syria-Turkey border.

The Dead Sea Fault and the convergent boundary north of it have produced many notable seismic events both long before and after the Aleppo earthquake. Some of these were so traumatic that they found their way into myth and theology of ancient peoples such as the quake occurring during the Crucifixion of Christ, or the 1500 BCE event which destroyed the city of Jericho and subsequently saw it abandoned. In 1927, the Jericho earthquake caused approximately 500 deaths and extensive damage, in particular to holy sites throughout the Holy Land.

== Earthquake characteristics ==
Carena and others (2023) postulated a ~50 km (31 mi) rupture along the longer and linear northern segment of the St. Simeon Fault corresponding to a M_{w} 7.2 earthquake. The fault runs for 80 km (50 mi) along a north–south trend with its southern termination just north of Atarib. Guidoboni and Comastri (2005) estimated a magnitude of M_{e} 6.0 which has been argued as too small of an estimate considering the extensive area of destruction. Italy's National Institute of Geophysics and Volcanology estimated the magnitude at M_{e} (equivalent magnitude from intensity distribution) 7.5.

== Description ==
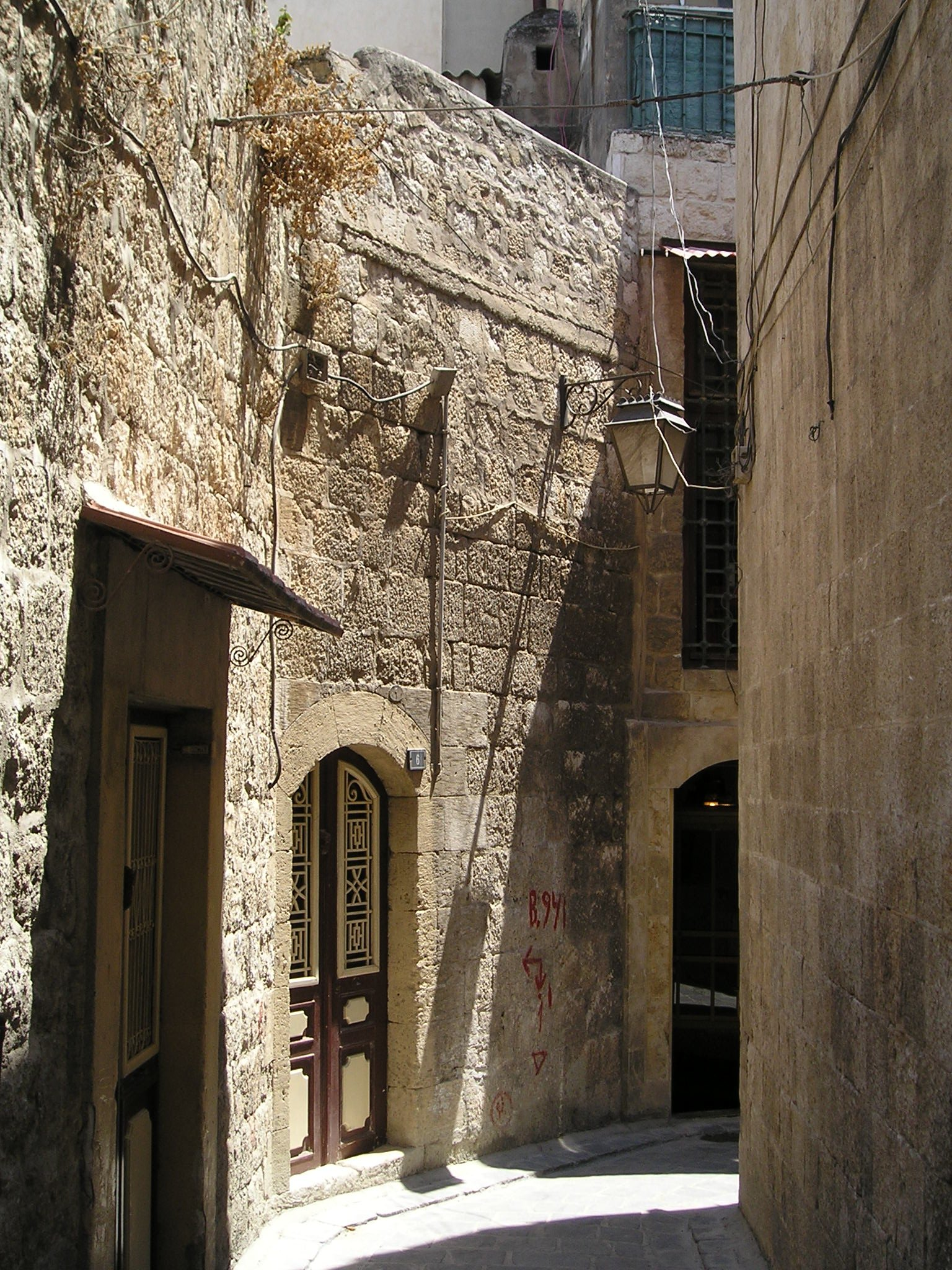
Street in the Christian Quarter of Aleppo

A contemporary chronicler in Damascus, Ibn al-Qalanisi, recorded the main quake on Wednesday, 11 October 1138. He wrote that it was preceded by an initial quake on 10 October and there were aftershocks on the evening of 20 October, on 25 October, on the night of 30 October–1 November, and finishing with another in the early morning of 3 November. However, Kemal al-Din, an author writing later, recorded only one earthquake on 19–20 October, which disagrees with al Qalanisi's account. Given that al Qalanisi was writing as the earthquakes occurred and that accounts from other historians support a 10 or 11 October date, his date of 11 October is considered authoritative. Sources today believe that the initial quake had an intensity greater than 7, and that it was accompanied by a tsunami. These factors contributed to the 1138 Aleppo earthquake being named one of the deadliest of all time.

The worst hit area was Harem, where Crusaders had built a large citadel. Sources indicate that the castle was destroyed and the church fell in on itself. The fort of Athareb, then occupied by Muslims, was destroyed. The citadel also collapsed, killing 600 of the castle guard, though the governor and some servants survived, and fled to Mosul. The town of Zardana, already sacked by the warring forces, was utterly obliterated, as was the small fort at Shih.

The residents of Aleppo, a large city of several tens of thousands during this period, had been warned by the foreshocks and fled to the countryside before the main earthquake. However, many people did not take the warnings of the foreshocks seriously, and decided to stay. This mistake cost many people their lives because the next day (October 11) the main shock occurred which caused the collapse of many buildings, killing thousands of people.

The walls of the citadel collapsed, as did the walls east and west of the citadel. Numerous houses were destroyed, with the stones used in their construction falling in streets. The cracks and holes in the foundations of the walls and buildings also caused further problems for the people of Aleppo. The holes allowed Crusaders and people from Muslim factions to invade the city, and another citadel in Aleppo was breached. Contemporary accounts of the damage simply state that Aleppo was destroyed, though comparison of reports indicate that it did not bear the worst of the earthquake.

Other reports claim that Azrab, which is north of Aleppo, experienced the worst of the damage. Reports claim that the ground split in the middle, swallowing the village. This was most likely the result of a landslide from the earthquake. Reports also state that the main earthquake and its aftershocks were felt in Damascus, but not in Jerusalem. Accounts of men being swallowed by holes opening in the ground at Raqqa were erroneously attributed to the Aleppo earthquake, and based on the confused late twelfth-century account of Michael the Syrian.

== Economic and political effects ==
The effects of the earthquake were not limited to the direct destruction caused by the shocks. The shocks and the destruction resulted in widespread interruption of economic and governmental activity. Most houses and their contents were completely destroyed. Many survivors fled to the desert.

The citadel was deserted and damaged, and about 60% of the urban fabric was destroyed. This mass destruction was expensive, and due to scarce revenue, there was not much reconstruction. The jobs and lives of people in the city were permanently altered. Also, new systems for the administration of buildings were implemented. This was their attempt to attract people back to the city and make more money, but it was never as successful as it had been in the past.

Aleppo lay on key land trade routes between Africa, Asia, and Europe. The disruption of this trade caused by the earthquake, along with the sack of Constantinople in the Fourth Crusade, precipitated a shift toward maritime trade and the rise of Italian merchant city-states like Venice, Pisa, and Genoa.

== See also ==
- List of historical earthquakes
- List of earthquakes in Turkey
- List of earthquakes in the Levant
