= 1344 Syria earthquake =

Earthquake

- Location within Syria
- Local date: January 1344
- Magnitude: M_{w} 6.8–7.6
- Epicenter: 36.527°N 37.956°E
- Max. intensity: MSK-64 VIII (Damaging)
- Casualties: 5,700 fatalities

A destructive earthquake affected present-day northwestern Syria and south-central Turkey in January 1344. Estimates of the seismic magnitude (M_{w}) range between 6.8 and 7.6. The MSK 64 intensity was VII–VIII at Manbij; VI–VII at Aleppo and IV at Damascus. Thousands died in Syria and many structures were destroyed.

The Aleppo area was devastated; most of Manbij was destroyed and majority of the population were killed by falling debris. A castle in the city was damaged and deaths occurred. The towers of citadel, mosques, monuments and walls collapsed. The death toll figure of 5,700 first appeared on a parametric earthquake catalog published in 1980. Heavy damage extended as far north as Gaziantep. Shaking was felt in Egypt. At Damascus, effects of the earthquake was slight. There were no documentation of damage at Antioch. Weak aftershocks occurred. Residents of Aleppo sought refuge away from the city for 40 days in fear of additional damage.

The exact date of the event varies between 2 or 3 January 1344. It was also dated to 1 January 1343.

== See also ==
- List of earthquakes in the Levant
- List of earthquakes in Turkey
