= Dead Sea Transform =

Fault system between the African and Arabian plates

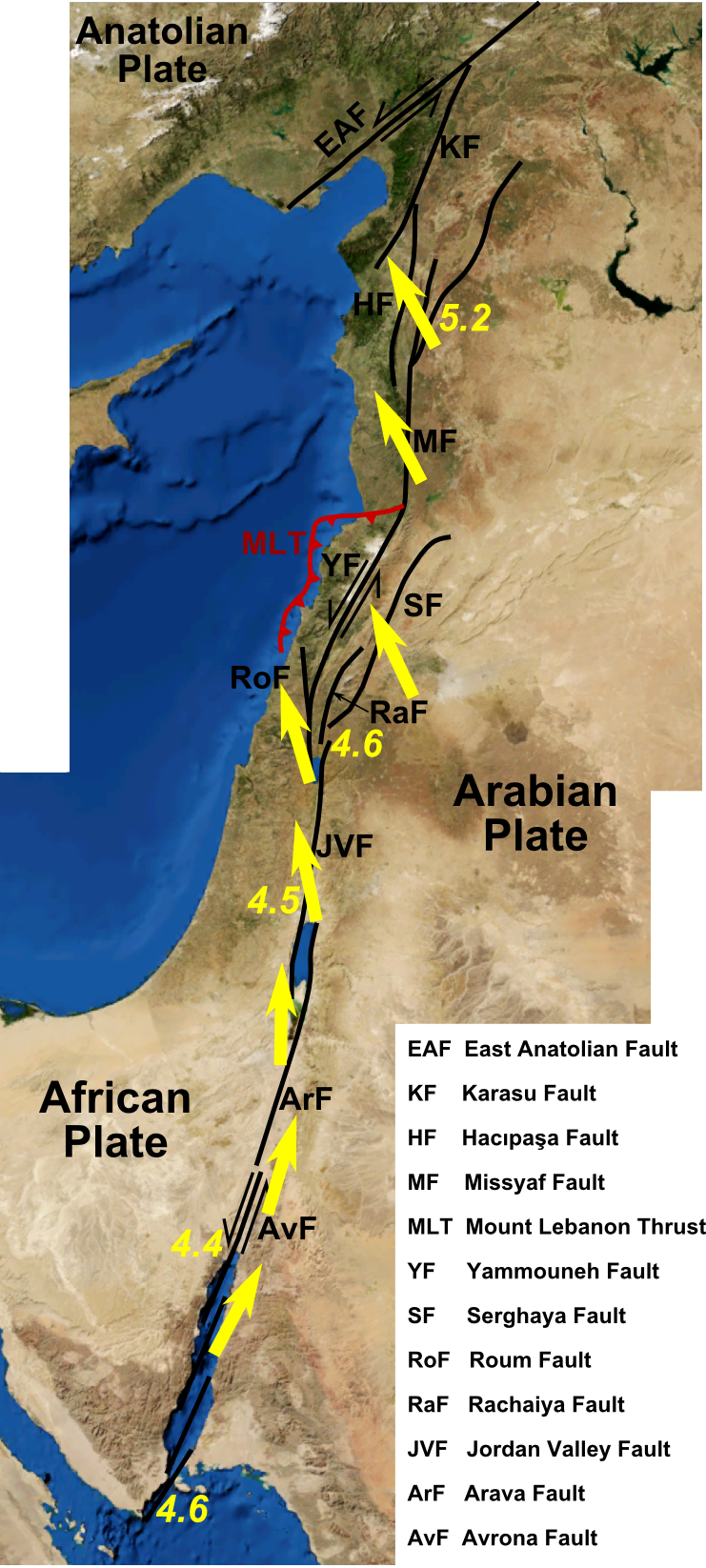
Map of the Dead Sea Transform showing the main fault segments and motion of the Arabian plate relative to the African plate, from GPS data

The Dead Sea Transform (DST) fault system, also sometimes referred to as the Dead Sea Rift, is a series of faults that run for about 1,000 km from the Marash triple junction (a junction with the East Anatolian Fault in southeastern Turkey) to the northern end of the Red Sea Rift (just offshore of the southern tip of the Sinai Peninsula). The fault system forms the transform boundary between the African plate to the west and the Arabian plate to the east. It is a zone of left lateral (sinistral) displacement, signifying the relative motions of the two plates. Both plates are moving in a general north-northeast direction, but the Arabian plate is moving faster, resulting in the observed left lateral motions along the fault of approximately 107 km at its southern end. A component of extension is also present in the southern part of the transform, which has contributed to a series of depressions, or pull-apart basins, forming the Gulf of Aqaba, Dead Sea, Sea of Galilee, and Hula basins. A component of shortening affects the Lebanon restraining bend, leading to uplift on both sides of the Beqaa Valley. There is local transtension in the northernmost part of the fault system, forming the Ghab pull-apart basin. The southern part of the fault system runs roughly along the political borders of Lebanon, northeast and southeast Israel, and Palestine's West Bank territory on its western side, and southern Syria and Jordan on the eastern side.

== Tectonic interpretation ==
The DST fault system is generally considered to be a transform fault that has accommodated a 105 km northwards displacement of the Arabian plate. This interpretation is based on observation of offset markers, such as river terraces, gullies and archaeological features, giving horizontal slip rates of several mm per year over the last few million years. GPS data give similar rates of present-day movement of the Arabian plate relative to the Africa plate. It has also been proposed that the fault zone is a rift system that is an incipient oceanic spreading center, the northern extension of the Red Sea Rift.

== Development ==
The Dead Sea Transform began to form during the Late Eocene with epeirogenic movement in the region, with the start of the faulting phase beginning in the Oligocene and continuing into the Miocene. During the Early to Middle Miocene (23–11.6 Ma), there was a change in plate motions, and rifting stopped in the Gulf of Suez Rift. The initial phase of northward propagation reached as far as southernmost Lebanon and was followed by a period in the Late Miocene where continuing displacement across the plate boundary was taken up mainly by shortening in the Palmyra fold belt. A total displacement of 64 km has been estimated for this early phase of motion. In the Pliocene the DST propagated northwards once more through Lebanon into northwestern Syria before reaching the East Anatolian Fault.

== Sections ==
=== Southern section ===
The southern section of the DST is about 400 km long, extending from the spreading center in the Red Sea at southern end of the Gulf of Aqaba to just north of the Hula basin in southernmost Lebanon.

==== Gulf of Aqaba ====
The Gulf of Aqaba was created by movement on four left-stepping strike-slip fault segments in a diagonal stepwise sequence known as echelon formation. In the areas where these segments overlap, pull-apart basins have developed, forming three bathymetric lows known as the Daka Deep, the Aragonese Deep and the Elat Deep. Parts of three of these faults ruptured during the 1995 Gulf of Aqaba earthquake.

==== Wadi Arabah ====
The Wadi Arabah (Arava Valley) segment of the DST extends for about 160 km from the Gulf of Aqaba to the southern end of the Dead Sea. Some researchers have further broken down this segment, recognising two separate segments, Avrona and Arava. The Avrona fault extends from the northern part of the Gulf of Aqaba for about 50 km along the Arava Valley. The Arava fault runs from just north of the Avrona fault segment for about 100 km.

A slip rate of 4 ±2 mm per year has been estimated from the offset of gullies across the fault. Four major earthquakes are well documented to have occurred due to movement on this fault in the last 1,000 years, in 1068, 1212, 1293 and 1458.

==== Dead Sea basin ====
The Dead Sea is formed in a pull-apart basin due to the left-stepping offset between the Wadi Arabah and Jordan Valley segments. The part of the basin with a sedimentary fill of more than 2 km is 150 km long and 15–17 km wide in its central part. In the north, the fill reaches its maximum thickness of about 10 km. The sequence includes Miocene fluvial sandstones of the Hazeva Formation overlain by a sequence of Late Miocene to early Pliocene evaporites, mainly halite, the Sedom Formation, and a lacustrine to fluvial sequence of Pliocene to recent age.

The Dead Sea basin is of particular interest due to its title as the lowest land-based elevation on Earth. Other qualities that make the Dead Sea basin unique is the apparent lack of earthquakes in the middle of the basin, an occurrence that is common amongst pull-apart basins as the transform fault tries to accommodate the left-stepping offset, a process that could be described as the fault trying to smooth itself into a more linear feature with no step-overs. The earthquakes are also much deeper than other transform earthquakes throughout the world. The basin also has a very low heat flow compared to other strike-slip faults like the San Andreas Fault. A hypothesis of why the Dead Sea basin has unique earthquake locations, earthquake depths, and a lower heat flow is the "drop-down" or damage rheology hypothesis. This hypothesis states that a heavy magmatic piece of lithosphere has lodged itself in the Moho boundary near the center of the Dead Sea, partitioning stress to the edges of the basin and allowing deeper earthquakes. This could explain the rhombohedral shape of the Dead Sea and the exceptional depth of the basin.

==== Jordan Valley fault ====
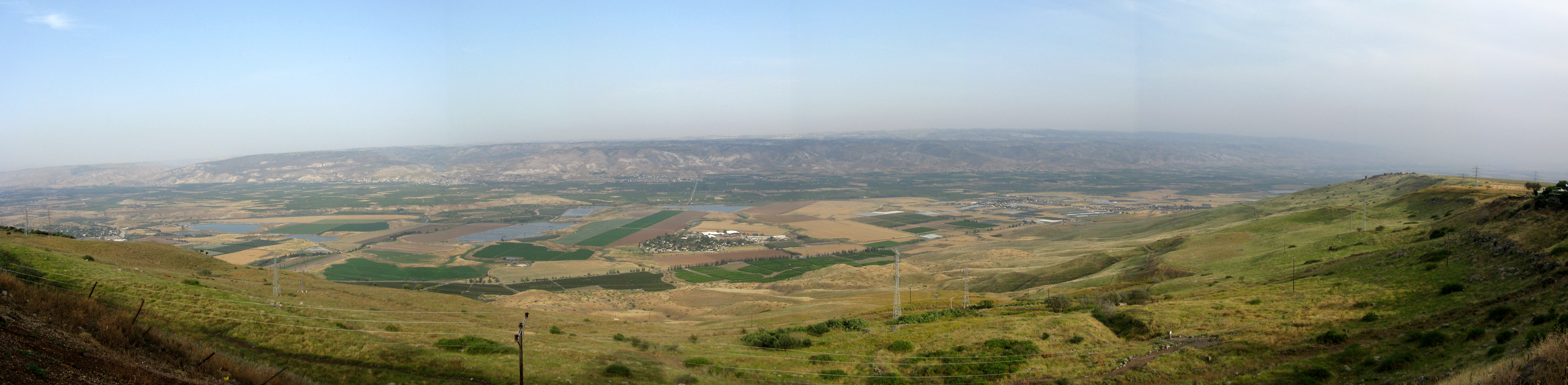
Panorama of Jordan Valley

The Jordan valley segment of the DST, which is part of the Jordan Rift Valley, runs for about 100 km from the northwestern part of the Dead Sea to the southeastern part of the Sea of Galilee along the Jordan Valley. A slip rate of between 4.7 and 5.1 mm per year has been estimated over the last 47,500 years. The entire segment is thought to have ruptured during the earthquake of 749 and again in 1033, the most recent major earthquake along this structure. The deficit in slip that has built up since the 1033 event is sufficient to cause an earthquake of M_{w}~7.4.

==== Sea of Galilee basin ====
The Sea of Galilee basin or Kinneret Basin is a pull apart formed between Jordan valley fault along its eastern edge and a set of smaller faults to the north. The central site of the basin's deepest sedimentary fill (its "depocentre" in geologists' jargon) lies on the eastern side, against the continuation of the Jordan valley fault. The thickness of the fill is estimated as 3 km down to the deepest mapped seismic reflection, correlated with the top of a basalt layer that was extruded about four million years ago.

==== Hula basin ====
The Hula pull-apart basin lies to the north of the Sea of Galilee basin and is formed between several short fault segments. The currently active part of the basin is relatively narrow. The Hula Western Border Fault defines the western side of the basin and splays to the north into several faults, including the Roum fault and the Yammouneh fault. The Hula Eastern Border Fault continues northwards from the northeastern part of the Sea of Galilee, forming the eastern edge of the basin and linking eventually to the Rachaya fault.

=== Lebanon restraining bend ===
The DST splays within the area of the restraining bend, with several distinct active fault segments recognised.

==== Yammouneh fault ====
The Yammouneh fault is the main fault strand within the Lebanon restraining bend, carrying most of the plate boundary displacement. It is SSW-NNE trending and runs for about 170 km from the northwestern end of the Hula Basin to its junction with the Missyaf Fault. It has been the location of several major historical earthquakes, such as the 1202 Syria event. The estimated average slip rate along the Yammouneh fault is 4.0 to 5.5 mm per year, with a major earthquake recurrence interval of 1020 to 1175 years. There have been no major earthquakes since that in 1202.

==== Roum fault ====
The Roum fault branches away from the Yammouneh fault at the northwestern part of the Hula Basin. It can be traced from there northwards for about 35 km before becoming indistinct. Movement on this fault has been linked to the 1837 Galilee earthquake. A slip-rate of 0.86–1.05 mm per year has been estimated.

==== Rachaya-Serghaya faults ====
This fault zone comprises two main fault strands, the Rachaya and Serghaya faults. The Serghaya fault branches off the Hula Eastern Border Fault, continuing northeastwards to the south of Mount Hermon into the Anti-Lebanon range where it becomes SSW-NNE trending. The fault has a slip rate of about 1.4 mm per year. Movement on this fault is thought to be responsible for the November 1759 earthquake. The Rachaya fault also branches off the Hula Eastern Border Fault, trending SSW-NNE, passing to the north of Mount Hermon. No slip rate has yet been estimated for this fault. The Rachaya fault is the interpreted location of the October 1759 earthquake.

=== Northern section ===
The northern section of the DST extends from the northern end of the Yammouneh fault up to the triple junction with the East Anatolian Fault. The over all deformation style is transpressional, in keeping with the relative plate motions as determined from GPS measurements.

==== Missyaf fault ====
This fault segment, also known as the Ghab fault, runs for about 70 km from the northern end of the Yammouneh fault into the Ghab basin. The estimated slip rate for this segment is 6.9 mm per year. Major historical earthquakes interpreted to have occurred along this structure include the M_{w}>7 events in AD 115 and 1170. No major earthquakes have been recorded since 1170, suggesting that such an event is overdue.

==== Ghab basin ====
The Ghab basin was formed in the Pliocene and is interpreted to be a pull-apart basin formed due to the overlap at the left-stepping offset between the Missyaf fault and the Hacıpaşa fault. The basin is about 60 km long and 15 km wide. Based on the interpretation of seismic reflection data and a single well penetration (Ghab-1) the fill of the basin is thought to be entirely Pliocene to recent in age. There are two main depocentres in the basin at the northern and southern end, separated by an intrabasinal high.

==== Hacıpaşa fault ====
The Hacıpaşa fault extends from the Ghab basin into the Amik basin. It is thought to carry the bulk of the plate boundary displacement linking through on to the Karasu fault. Major earthquakes in 1408 and 1872 have been linked to movement on this fault.

==== Karasu fault ====
The Karasu fault or Amanos fault has SW-NE trend and represents part of the transition from the DST to the East Anatolian Fault. It has an estimated slip rate of 1.0 to 1.6 mm per year for the whole Quaternary. On 6 February 2023, a M_{w} 7.8 earthquake ruptured the Karasu fault, together with the Pazarcık and Erkenek segments of the East Anatolian Fault. The Karasu fault also ruptured during M_{w} 7.5 and M_{w} 7.2 earthquakes in 521 and 1872, respectively.

== See also ==
- List of earthquakes in the Levant
- Beqaa Valley
- Great Rift Valley (geographical concept)
- Jordan Rift Valley
