= Roum, Lebanon =

Roum روم
- Municipality
- Location in Lebanon
- Coordinates: 33°33′07″N 35°31′44″E
- Country: Lebanon
- Governorate: South Governorate
- District: Jezzine District
- Time zone: UTC+2 (EET)
  - Summer (DST): +3

Roum (Arabic: روم, romanized: Rūm) is a municipality in the Jezzine District of the South Governorate of Lebanon.

== History ==
In 1838, Eli Smith noted it as Ram, a village located in "Aklim Jezzin, East of et-Tuffa".

== Demographics ==
In 2014, Christians made up 62.61% and Muslims made up 37.08% of registered voters in Roum. 38.80% of the voters were Greek Catholics, 35.51% were Shiite Muslims and 20.63% were Maronite Catholics.

== Bibliography ==
- Robinson, E.; Smith, E. (1841). Biblical Researches in Palestine, Mount Sinai and Arabia Petraea: A Journal of Travels in the year 1838. Vol. 3. Boston: Crocker & Brewster.
