= 92 BC Levant earthquake =

Eastern Mediterranean earthquake and tsunami

The 92 BC Levant earthquake is mentioned in catalogues of historical earthquakes. An earthquake and a tsunami reportedly affected areas of the Levant, including the modern states of Cyprus, Egypt, Israel, and Syria.

== Primary sources ==
There is a mention of the earthquake in the Megillat Taanit (Scroll of Fasts). Classical sources mention the earthquake affecting the city of Apamea, Phrygia, but do not mention effects on the wider Levant.

A Greek inscription from Magdolum mentions a "seismos" (Greek for earthquake) which affected Egypt, at some point between 97 and 94 BC. But it has been suggested that the inscription was metaphorically describing a local "disturbance" or an incident of extortion.

== Jewish accounts ==
The main Jewish source on the earthquake is the Megillat Taanit. The text summarizes Jewish oral traditions about 35 dates of joyous events in Jewish history, mainly recording events to the reign of the Hasmonean dynasty (167–37 BC). At these dates, it was prohibited to either observe mourning or fasting.

When the text was written is unclear, though it predates the Siege of Jerusalem (70 AD) and the destruction of the Second Temple. The text focuses on the annual observance of dates, and not on historiography. The events are recorded by their order in the annual calendar, and not by their chronological order in history.

The observances themselves were only celebrated for a few centuries, but the text was preserved and transmitted in the Jewish literary canon. The Scroll of Fasts includes both a brief record of events, and three versions of Gemara (Scholia) which were added to the original text as addendums. There are three main surviving manuscripts. The exegesis which was added to the original text dates from the Talmudic period (2nd–6th centuries) to the Late Middle Ages.

The quality of the Scholia as historical sources is often unclear. Some of the explanations are "historically correct", and may reflect that their author used a valuable oral or written source to make his additions. Other explanations are of poor value, and reflect the questionable competence of their author. Scribal errors are commonplace in these manuscripts, with frequent errors in the copying of geographic and personal names. This explains most of the differences between the manuscript copies.

The main surviving versions of the text are the Parma manuscript (14th century), the Oxford manuscript (15th century), and a Common version (also known as the "Vulgata"). The Parma manuscript derives its information from the Babylonian Talmud, while the Oxford manuscript derives its information from the Jerusalem Talmud. The Common version is the last of them chronologically, and has copied information from both earlier versions. The blending of information from the two manuscript traditions seems to have started before the 11th century. It was complete by the time the first printed version of the text was published in Mantua during 1519.

Information on the earthquake is attached to an event dated to the 17th day of the month Adar in the Hebrew calendar. The event is the 33rd event covered in the text. According to the original Megillat Taanit, on that date "the natives" attacked a remnant of scribes in the country of "Belikos" and "Beit Zabdai". A salvation came to the "House of Israel". The Parma manuscript claims that "the natives" wanted to kill the "scribes of Israel". The scribes escaped to "Beit Zabadi", and the date of their escape was turned into an annual holiday. The Oxford manuscript claims that Alexander Jannaeus, the King of Judaea (reigned 103–76 BC) wanted to kill the brothers "Bukinos" and "Bukius", who escaped him and fled to Syria. The natives of the country of "Blikus" gathered to kill the brothers, but a great "raash" ("earthquake" of "clamor") send by El Shaddai (God Almighty) rescued the brothers. In the Common version, Alexander Jannaeus wanted to kill the scribes, who escaped him and fled to the country of "Koselikos". The natives were gentiles who rose against the scribes and wanted to kill them. The scribes managed to scare away their attackers and then fled to "Bet Zabadi". In this version, a comment by "Rabbi Hidka" records that the sea itself upwelled and "destroyed a third in the settled land".

The original text and the Parma version do not mention the earthquake, but the earthquake is described by the Oxford version. The Common version apparently describes a tsunami and attributes it to an earthquake. In the Oxford version, a God-send disaster rescues the scribes. The Rabbi Hidka credited with the tsunami description of the Common version was a historical sage of the 2nd century. The implication in the Common version is that the tsunami interfered with the attack of the natives.

The Oxford and Common versions may derive their description of the earthquake and the tsunami from extinct "local traditions". They may have also derived their descriptions from earthquake records in texts which were outside the Jewish literary tradition. The locations of the event is variously described as first "Belikos". "Belikot", "Chalbos", "Cholbos", "Chalikus", "Coselicos", "Calicos", and then "Beit Zabdin", "Beit Zabdai", and "Beit Zabadi". These seem to be misspellings. Modern scholars have identified the first location with Chalcis in Syria (modern Qinnasrin), and the second location with Zabadea in Lebanon-Syria.

In antiquity, there were many locations known as Chalcis, and two of them were located in Syria. The first was Chalcis sub Libanum, identified with the modern Anjar, Lebanon. It was located in the Beqaa Valley, about 10 km (6.2 mi) southeast of Baalbek. It was also located near Zabadea, a narrow plain that included modern Al-Zabadani. Zabadani is located 25 km (16 mi) to the north-northwest of Damascus. The ancient city of Kaprazabadion (modern Qafr Zabad) was located 25 km (16 mi) southwest of this Chalcis.

The second Chalcis was Chalcis ad Belum, identified with modern Hadir and Qinnasrin in north Syria. This city was located less than 100 km (62 mi) southeast of Antioch. Zabadea, in this case, may be identified with the locations of Zebed, Zebadi on the Orontes River, and Zabboude. However, all three of these locations were first mentioned in texts dating after the end of ancient history.

Neither of the two Chalcis was located close to the coasts of the Levant, and would be unlikely to be directly affected by a tsunami. The tsunami description may be based on a catastrophic inundation along the littoral zone, which diverted the attention of the "native" attackers.

The historical context of the event is unclear. The fleeing scribes may have been trying to flee Alexander Jannaeus, who is described as a particularly cruel monarch by Josephus. Alexander is known to have persecuted the Pharisees, who were opposed to his reign. But the original text does not mention Alexander Jannaeus, and his name may have been added to the text by a later-day interpreter. The scribes may have fled "oppression and slaughter" in the context of the many political upheavals in the Levant during the 2nd century BC. The Levant had at the time a multicultural population, and experienced frequent shifts in "political fortunes" and short-lived alliances.

The Oxford version names the scribes as Bukius and Bukinos, but these may not be actual persons. But just a Colloquialism to refer to an otherwise unnamed group. Historians theorize that the event took place in the context of the victorious campaigns of Jonathan Apphus (reigned 161–142 BC) against his enemy Demetrius II Nicator (reigned 145–138 BC). 1 Maccabees records that Jonathan had attacked the Zabadeans, crushed his enemies in battle, and plundered their territory.

== Classical accounts ==
This earthquake has been identified with one or more earthquakes known to have destroyed Apamea, Phrygia c. 90 BC. The city is identified with Celaenae, located on the Meander River.

The earthquake is mentioned in the Deipnosophistae by Athenaeus, who identifies Nicolaus of Damascus as his source on the topic. In Athenaeus' narrative, the earthquake is accompanied by flooding, the change of river courses, appearance and disappearance of lakes, and the ingression of sea waters. The same earthquake is mentioned by Strabo. According to Strabo's narrative, Mithridates VI of Pontus (reigned 120–63 BC) offered to rebuild the destroyed Apamea.

Apamea was located about 100 km (62 mi) from the Mediterranean coast, and was surrounded by hills. It is unlikely that it was affected by a tsunami. It is more likely that the rivers Meander and Marsyas flooded, and there were changes in the surface levels of nearby lakes. Floods were far from uncommon in its vicinity, and local folklore connects the area to Noah's Ark and the Genesis flood narrative.

Earthquakes are also connected to the earlier reign of Jonathan Apphus. A major one is recorded by Athenaus and Strabo. Athenaus names Posidonius as his source on the event. According to these accounts, an ocean wave of extraordinary height dashed upon the shore. All men in its path were reportedly engulfed and drowned. The location of the event was somewhere between Tyre, Lebanon and Ptolemais in Phoenicia (modern Acre, Israel).

The earthquake and tsunami reportedly followed a battle involving Diodotus Tryphon (reigned 142–138 BC) and the army of the Seleucid Empire. This would place the event between the start of Tryphon's mutiny in 145 BC and Tryphon's suicide in 138 BC. Jonathan's campaign against the Zabadeans took place while Jonathan and Tryphon were allied to each other. Placing this earthquake to c. 143 BC.

The earthquake may also be identified with a disaster described elsewhere by Posidonius, which took place along the Levant littoral. An unidentified city above Sidon collapsed into the sea. In Sidon itself, nearly two-thirds of the city were engulfed. The shock affected the whole of Syria. However this disaster is otherwise connected to the emergence of the volcanic island of Hiera (modern Palea Kameni) in 198 BC. Sidon's earthquake is also mentioned in De rerum natura by Lucretius and Naturales quaestiones by Seneca the Younger. Neither text connects the earthquake to a specific date or historical context.

An earthquake during the reign of Jonathan Apphus is also recorded by the chronicle of John Malalas (6th century). In this narrative, the earthquake took place in the reign of Antiochus, grandson of Grypus. It is unclear who this monarch is, though it may be a misdated reference to Antiochus VII Sidetes (reigned 138–129 BC). In this Antiochus' 8th regnal year, the city of Antioch suffered from the "wrath of God" (an earthquake) and had to be rebuilt. Malalas offers inconsistent dates for the event. He places the event 152 years after Seleucus I Nicator (reigned 305–281 BC) established the city. This would place the event c. 148 BC, a full decade before Antiochus VII rose to the throne. It has been suggested that Malalas conflated accounts of two different earthquakes, the first taking place in 148 BC, and the other in 130 BC (Antriochus VII' 8th regnal years). Malalas mentions as his own source the chronicle of Domninos, who is not known from other sources.

Alternatively, the earthquake connected to Jonathan Apphus has been dated to c. 142 BC, 8 years following the death of Demetrius I Soter (reigned 161–150 BC). Whether the earthquake who affected Antioch was the same one which affected Chalcis is unclear.

== Modern explanations ==
The textual evidence for the earthquake is uneven, and the compilers of the Scholia to Megillat Taanit may have misunderstood the true nature of the 17th Adar events. If the earthquake affected the Holy Land, it is unclear why the Jews would consider the event a "joyous day". It would be more likely seen as a day of mourning and fasting. If the earthquake instead affected a distant region of Syria and did not harm the "oppressed Jewish communities" of Syria, it would be more likely to be seen as a divine event by the Jews.

On whether the earthquake took place during the reign of Jonathan Apphus or that of Alexander Jannaeus, there seem to be more primary sources favoring the earlier date rather than the later one. No evidence has been found that the earthquake affected Egypt, which was located 750 km (470 mi) away from Apamea. The reported tidal wave between Tyre and Ptolemais took place 75 km (47 mi) away from Chalcis sub Libanum. The earthquake and submergence of Sidon took place nearby, and the earthquake of Antioch took place 250 km (160 mi) away. All three events can be safely dated to the 2nd century BC, probably during Jonathan's reign.

There are insufficient evidence to attribute all reported events to a single earthquake, rather than an entire series on seismic events. However, the paleoseismic study of the Serghaya fault, suggested that only one seismic event took place there between 170 BC and 20 AD.
