= 1202 Syria earthquake =

Earthquake affecting the Levant

- Local date: 20 May 1202
- Local time: Dawn
- Magnitude: 7.6 M_{s}
- Epicenter: 33.5°N 36.0°E
- Areas affected: Ayyubid Sultanate; Kingdom of Jerusalem
- Max. intensity: MMI XI (Extreme)
- Tsunami: Yes
- Casualties: 30,000

The 1202 Syria earthquake struck at about dawn on 20 May 1202 (598 AH) with an epicenter in southwestern Syria. The earthquake is estimated to have killed around 30,000 people. It was felt over an extensive area, from Sicily to Mesopotamia and Anatolia to upper Egypt, mostly affecting the Ayyubid Sultanate and the Kingdom of Jerusalem. The cities of Tyre, Acre and Nablus were heavily damaged. A magnitude of M_{s} 7.6 has been estimated with damage up to XI on the Mercalli intensity scale.

== Records of the earthquake ==
A large earthquake or series of earthquakes is described in many written sources during the period 1201–1202 (597–598 AH). It is unclear as to whether they refer to a single mainshock with several large aftershocks or more than one unrelated earthquake. Given the rarity of such large events in this area it has been considered more likely that the reports all refer to the same mainshock. Other workers have recognised two separate events, the earlier (M_{s} 7.5) on 6 June 1201 and the latter (M_{s} 6.8) on 20 May 1202, occurring on two different (but contiguous) segments of the Dead Sea Transform.

== Cause ==
The distribution of reported damage strongly suggests that the earthquake resulted from movement on a segment of the dominantly strike-slip Dead Sea Transform. Detailed studies of recent sediments along the line of the Yammoûneh Fault, which borders the Beqaa Valley, support movement on this fault as the most likely origin for the 1202 earthquake. Field evidence of the 1202 earthquake rupture has been reported from the displacement of the walls of the Vadum Iacob Crusader fortress (at Tell Ateret) and from displaced stream channels in the Bet Saida Valley.

The tsunami reports associated with this earthquake are unlikely to be directly caused by the movement of the fault as none of the fault displacement happened beneath the sea. Most large tsunamis recorded in the eastern Mediterranean are thought to be the result of seismically triggered underwater landslides.

== Effects ==
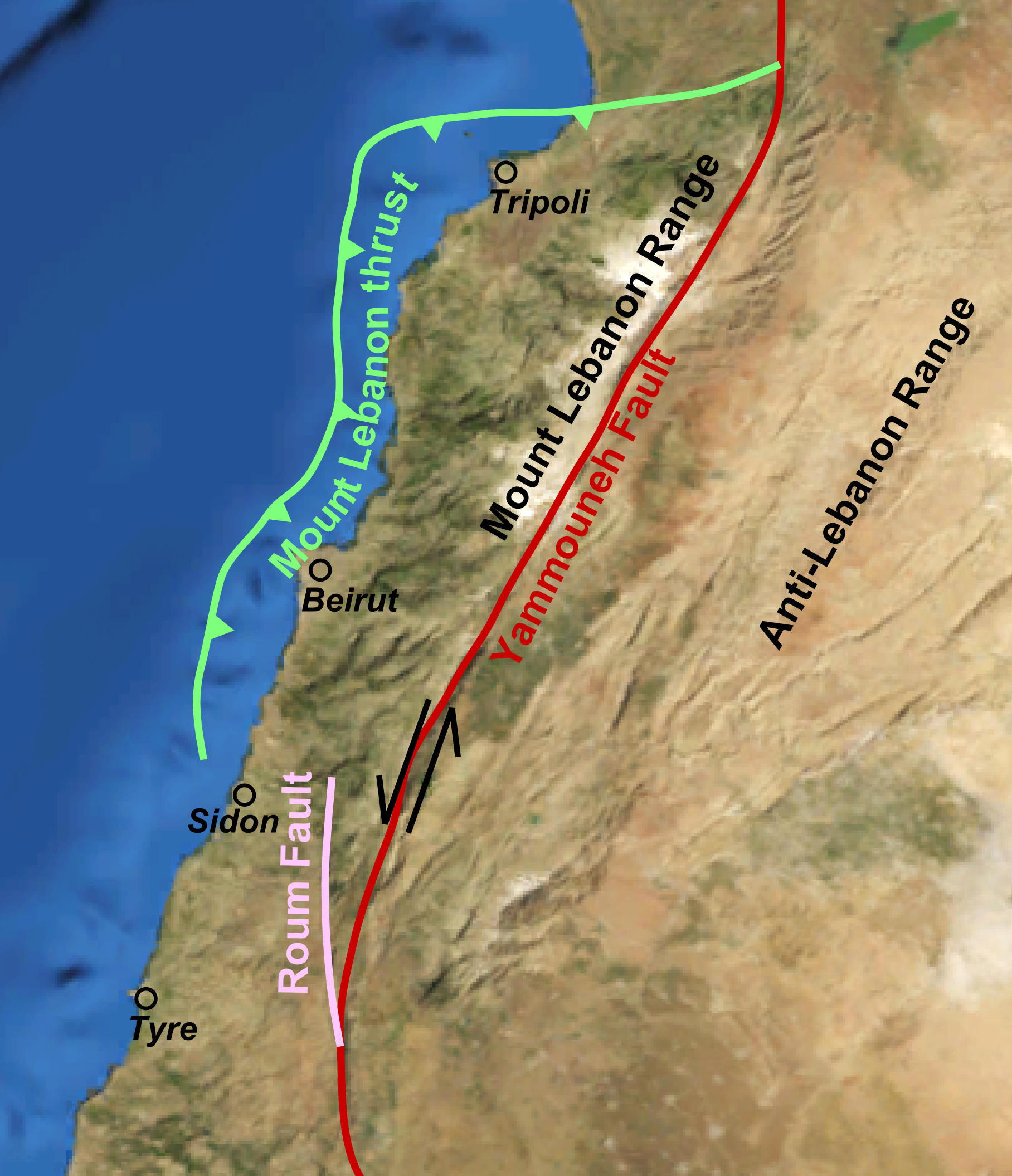
The Yammouneh fault

=== Areas affected ===
The earthquake was felt from Sicily in the west to northwestern Iran in the east, and from Constantinople in the north to Aswan in the south. The affected areas – listed by decreasing order of the intensity – were, in today's terms, Lebanon, central Palestine, western Syria, Cyprus, northern Israel, Jerusalem, Jordan, southern Turkey (Antioch, Lesser Armenia, eastern Anatolia), Sicily, Iraq and Iran, Egypt (as far south as Aswan), Constantinople and Ceuta.

The greatest damage was reported from Mount Lebanon, Tyre, Acre, Baalbek, Beit Jann, Samaria, Nablus, Banias, Damascus, Hauran, Tripoli and Hama (VIII–IX on the Mercalli intensity scale).

=== Tsunami ===
The tsunami probably associated with this event was observed in eastern Cyprus and along the Syrian and Lebanese coasts.

=== Casualties ===
Although a figure of 1,100,000 deaths is often quoted for this earthquake, it includes all deaths for the year in question, including those from the famine and subsequent epidemics caused by the failure of the Nile flood that year. A more realistic estimate of 30,000 deaths has been made from the analysis of contemporary records.

== See also ==
- List of historical earthquakes
- List of tsunamis
