= 2024 Attica wildfires =

Natural disasters in Greece

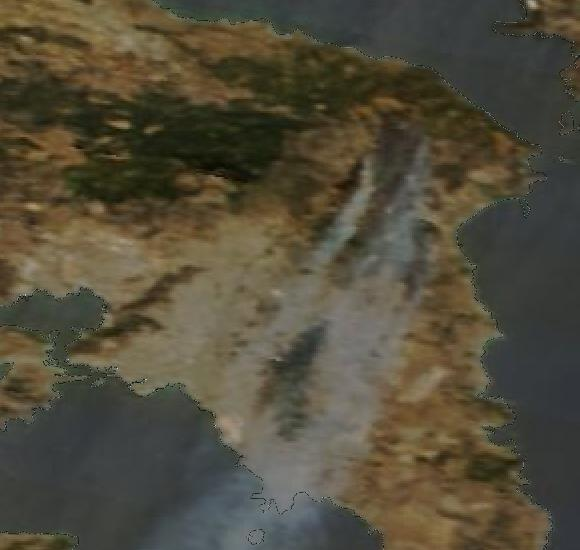
- NASA satellite image showing a cloud of smoke over Attica on August 12, 2024
- Date: 11–14 August; 15:02 –
- Location: Attica, Greece
- Coordinates: 38°14′40″N 23°55′43″E

Statistics
- Burned area: 8,594.2 ha (21,237 acres)

Impacts
- Deaths: 1
- Injuries: 2
- Structures destroyed: 20

Ignition
- Cause: heat wave, wind

On the afternoon of 11 August 2024, a wildfire fire hit the northeastern Attica region of Greece. The fire broke out in the area of Varnavas, northeast of Athens, at 3:02 PM, according to Fire Colonel Vassileios Vathrakogiannis, the Fire Service spokesman and quickly spread due to strong winds. The flames caused the evacuation of many settlements and caused severe damage to homes and forest lands. The fire affected significant parts of northeastern Attica and threatening the northern districts of Athens. Media outlets referred to this as: “Greece’s worst wildfire of the year 2024.”

== Description ==
The series of wildfires started with two large forest fires on August 11, 2024, at 03:00 P.M., 35 km north of Athens, near Varnavas. Some of the fires in this series had flames were higher than 25 meters (80 feet). The fires were ignited by hot and windy conditions in the area. The summer of 2024 is said to be Greece's hottest June and July on record.

The fire spread southward and burned on three fronts, including the village of Grammatiko, the town of Marathon, the seaside municipality of Nea Makri and Mount Penteli.

Another blaze in a forested area near the town of Megara, west of Athens, started on 11 August, but had been contained by the afternoon of 12 August, according to the fire brigade.

== Firefighting efforts ==
Early attempts involved 120 firefighters, nine ground teams, 23 vehicles, two planes and three helicopters. Residents were being evacuated toward Grammatiko and Kifisia.

Shortly after 18:00, 250 firefighters with 67 fire engines, were already fighting the fire on the ground, by water wagons from the regional administration and the armed forces. 12 planes and 6 helicopters were dousing the fires and one helicopter served to coordinate them.

On 12 August, the forces deployed against the flames were increased to 560 firefighters, together with 16 teams of forest commandos and 177 vehicles, while 32 aircraft (17 airplanes and 15 helicopters) were operating from the air. The Hellenic Army was also been deployed to assist.

On August 12, Greece activated the Union Civil Protection Mechanism (UCPM). Additionally, aid was sent to Greece by the Czech Republic (sending 75 firefighters), Turkey, France, Italy, and Spain. The aid was sent in the form of planes and helicopters.

By 13 August, the wildfire no longer had a single front. According to the Fire Brigade, the firefighters had to deal with scattered pockets of fire from Varnavas to Nea Makri and Penteli, while there were constant rekindlings.

Civil Protection Minister Vassilis Kikilias stated that overall, a total of 702 firefighters were deployed, with 27 forest commando groups, 199 vehicles, while 17 aircraft and 18 helicopters operated periodically, three of which had a coordinating role. In total, Civil Protection sent evacuation messages to 45 areas of Attica.

== International assistance ==
On 12 August, the EU Civil Protection Mechanism was mobilized. The following countries responded:

- Romania – 40 firefighters were deployed.
- France – One Eurocopter AS332 Super Puma were expected to arrive.
- Italy – Two Canadair firefighting aircraft were expected to arrive.
- Czech Republic – 75 firefighters and 25 firefighting vehicles, including nine water wagons, were expected to arrive.
- Cyprus was preparing to send a large team of firefighters.
- Spain offered help, with arrangements to be finalized.

Other countries' contribution:

- Moldova deployed its General Inspectorate for Emergency Situations (IGSU) in the region.
- Turkey offered to send two Air Tractor AT-802 fire-fighting aircraft.

== Impact and reaction ==
According to the Copernicus EMS Rapid Mapping Viewer, the fire fronts reached a total of 23.9 km (14.9 mi), while the fire burned 8,594.2 hectares (21,237 acres) of land, with 157.8 hectares (390 acres) accounting for land consisting of residential buildings. It was the first time that a wildfire that started around the Attica region, penetrated so deep within the residential core of the city of Athens, reaching the suburbs of Vrilissia and Chalandri.

As of August 14, the fires had burned 40 square miles of land, northeast of Athens. The fires badly affected the suburbs of Nea Penteli, Palaia Penteli, Patima Chalandri, and Vrilissia, with 100 homes damaged beyond repair.

A week after the fire, the Greek government announced a reforestation program for over 5,800 hectares throughout Attica. This covers previously burned areas of the last 15 years which can not naturally regenerate.

== Casualties ==
One firefighter was injured while fighting the fire in the area of Marathon, suffering second degree burns to his hands and legs. He was first taken to the Nea Makri health centre and then to the 251 Air Force General Hospital.

Two fire trucks were engulfed in flames in the area of Neos Voutzas, where the fire is raging out of control. One firefighter suffered minor burns and the remaining three were in good health.

A hospital, a children's hospital and a military hospital, as well as at least two monasteries, were also evacuated.

Thirty-one people from areas of north-eastern Attica were transported to hospitals with respiratory problems.

As the fires approached Athens, they had already taken over Mount Penteli. This led to the death of one woman and the evacuation of thousands of residents. In the early hours of 13 August, the charred body of a 62-year-old Moldovan woman was found inside the building of a local business, at the Patima neighborhood of the Athenian suburb of Chalandri. She had been missing since noon of the previous day.

== Attica fires chronology ==
- 1981: Kifissia, 612 hectares
- 1982: Dionysos, 1,360 hectares
- 1986: Varympompi, 500 hectares
- 1992: Avlonas, 6,700 hectares
- 1993: Mount Penteli, 5,700 hectares
- 2005: Rafina, 1,100 hectares
- 2007: Parnitha, 5,000 hectares
- 2009: Penteli, 21,000 hectares
- 2018: Mati and Rafina, 1,431 hectares
- 2021: Parnitha, 420 hectares

== See also ==
- List of Wildfires
- 2024 Portugal wildfires
- 2018 Attica wildfires
- 2007 Greek forest fires
- 2009 Greek forest fires
- 2023 Greece wildfires
- 2009 Mediterranean wildfires
- 2012 Chios Forest Fire
- 2021 Turkish wildfires
