= Greek forest fires =

Greek forest fires may refer to:

- 2007 Greek forest fires
- 2009 Greek forest fires
- 2012 Chios Forest Fire

== See also ==
- Greek fires (disambiguation)
