= Greek fires =

Greek fires and similar terms may refer to:

Fires in Greece

- Great Thessaloniki Fire of 1917
- 2007 Greek forest fires
- 2009 Greek forest fires
- 2012 Chios Forest Fire
- 2018 Attica wildfires
- 2021 Greece wildfires
- 2023 Greece wildfires
- 2024 Greek wildfires

Other uses

- Greek fire, an incendiary weapon
- Greek Fire (band), a rock band
- Greek Fire (novel), a 1957 novel by Winston Graham
