= 2023 Greece wildfires =

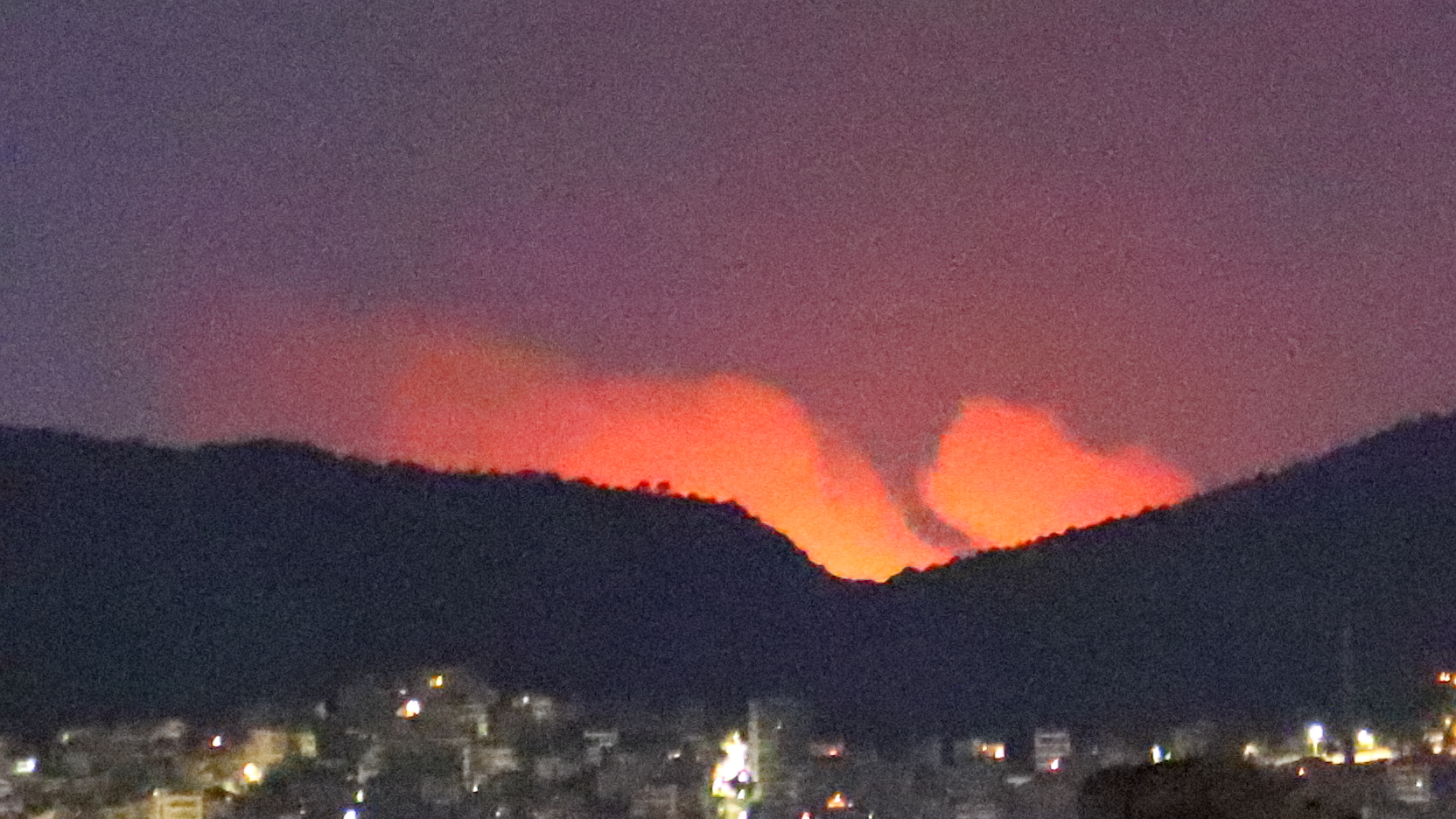
- Dervenochoria fire as seen from Ilion, at approximately 2 am on 18 July. These are not flames but the glare from the fire due to the camera settings. The fire is behind the mountains.
- Location: Attica, Central Greece, Corfu, East Macedonia and Thrace, Evia, Peloponnese, Thessaly, Rhodes and Western Greece

Statistics
- Total fires: 80+
- Burned area: 1,800 km^{2} (690 sq mi)

Impacts
- Deaths: 28
- Injuries: 75+
- Evacuated: 20,000+
- Structures lost: Hotels, residences, schools and barns.
- Cost: €600 million (2023)

Ignition
- Cause: 2023 European heat waves Human negligence or arson (suspected)

In July 2023, multiple wildfires started in Greece. They resulted in at least 28 deaths and injured 75 people, with over 80 wildfires being recorded. Seventy-nine people were arrested for arson.

High temperatures reached 41.0 °C (105.8 °F), with highs anticipated to reach 45.0 °C (113.0 °F) in Rhodes. Forecasters were suggesting that the heatwave engulfing Greece was set to be the longest in its history, lasting up to 16–17 days, surpassing the 1987 heatwave. It was also expected to be the hottest July recorded in more than 50 years.

Following a series of heatwaves and wildfires taking place over Europe, wildfires in Greece started on 17 July 2023. The Greek government established a Crisis Management Unit to respond to the situation. A wildfire that started on the Greek island of Rhodes on 18 July led to the evacuation of four locations, including two seaside resorts. Approximately 2,000 people, including tourists, were safely evacuated by sea, accounting for less than 10% of the island's tourist accommodations, according to the Fire Corps spokesman. On 22 August, eighteen bodies were found in a forested area of northern Greece; initial reports suggested those who died may have been migrants. Additionally, as days passed with more land being burned and property being destroyed more and more, civilians started complaining about the lack of strength in Greece's firefighting capabilities—something that they attribute to government mismanagement.

== Cause ==
According to a senior climate crisis official, 667 fires were caused by a "human hand", blaming either negligence or arson. 79 arrests were made as of late August.

By 25 August, officials had arrested 163 people on fire-related charges since the start of the fire prevention season, including 118 for negligence and 24 for deliberate arson, and the police had made a further 18 arrests according to government spokesperson Pavlos Marinakis.

Intense winds exacerbated Greece's wildfires, sparking over 50 new blazes amid hot, dry weather; casualties include two deaths and two injured firefighters on 21 August 2023.

== Impact by area ==
=== Attica ===
Three major wildfires broke out in the area of Attica on 17 July, in Kalyvia, Loutraki, and Dervenochoria. Greek authorities directed villagers to evacuate their homes in southern Athens. On 20 July, wildfires reignited in Athens as a result of wind, which forced an evacuation effort in the city. On 22 August, another major wildfire broke out near Fyli, in a monastery. The 25 km/h strong winds made it very difficult to put out and resulted in the area being evacuated. The fire progressed during the night and on 23 August it reached the Parnitha mountain. On 24 August the fire was put out. The fire destroyed a few homes.

=== Corfu ===
On 23 July, mass evacuations were ordered in Corfu following major wildfire breakouts on the island.

People in Rou, Katavolos, Kentroma, Tritsi, Kokokila, Sarakiniatika, Plagia, Kalami, Vlachatika, and Kavalerena were told to evacuate and move to Ipsos, while people in Viglatouri and Nisaki were advised to evacuate to Barbati.

=== Evia ===
In Karystos, the flames reached a height of 20 metres (66 ft) and the mayor asked for increased use of aerial vehicles in extinguishing operations. A man was reported to have died from heat stroke as a result of the wildfires on the island of Evia. On 25 July 2023, a Canadair CL-215 crashed in Karystos, killing its two pilots, with a similar incident that happened almost 15 years to the day in the same area with the same casualties. Later the same day, a 41-year-old shepherd was found charred in an inaccessible area outside the village of Platanistos in Karystos.

=== Magnesia ===
Two major wildfires broke out in the area of Magnesia on 26 July, in Almyros and near Velestino. The fires managed to reach Nea Anchialos Air Base and the Industrial Zone of Volos. Many F-16s were ordered to move from Nea Anchialos Air Base to Larissa Air Base for safety reasons. The wildfire reached an ammunition warehouse and several explosions occurred, triggering the evacuation of the Nea Anchialos town.

=== Rhodes ===
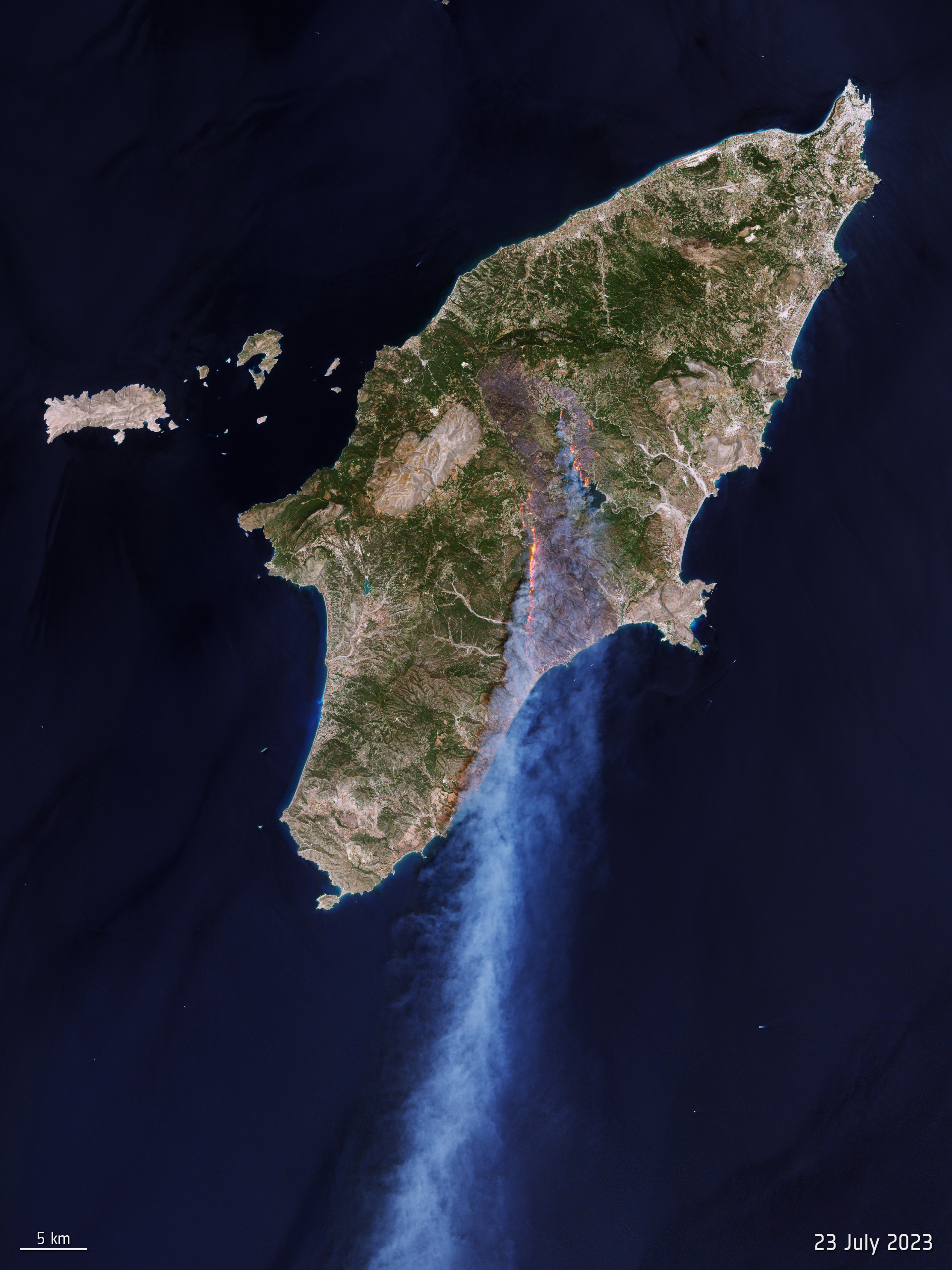
Satellite view of the wildffire in Rhodes, 23 July 2023

The island of Rhodes suffered multiple wildfires, which resulted in over an estimated 19,000 people being evacuated by land and sea. Emergency alerts were sent to residents on the island to warn them of the wildfires and to evacuate.

The fire department in Rhodes stated the fires there prompted the "largest evacuation operation" ever on the island, with the fire department using 10 firefighting airplanes, eight firefighting helicopters, over 260 firefighters, 49 fire trucks and hundreds of volunteers, among others, to tackle the blaze on the island.

Authorities declared a state of emergency on 20 July 2023 in three municipalities of Rhodes, including Lindos, which is home to many tourist villages.

On 21 July, the Civil Protection ordered the evacuation of the village of Laerma, which is about 10 km from the coastal tourist resorts.

On 23 July 2023, it was announced that 1,200 extra people would be evacuated from the villages of Pefki, Lindos, and Kalathos. Flights to Rhodes from British package holiday company Jet2.com were cancelled until 30 July 2023 and from TUI until 26 July 2023.

On 2 August, the Ministry of Tourism lifted the state of emergency on Rhodes and offered complimentary travel accommodations to tourists who were evacuated from the island in the previous month.

=== Alexandroupolis ===
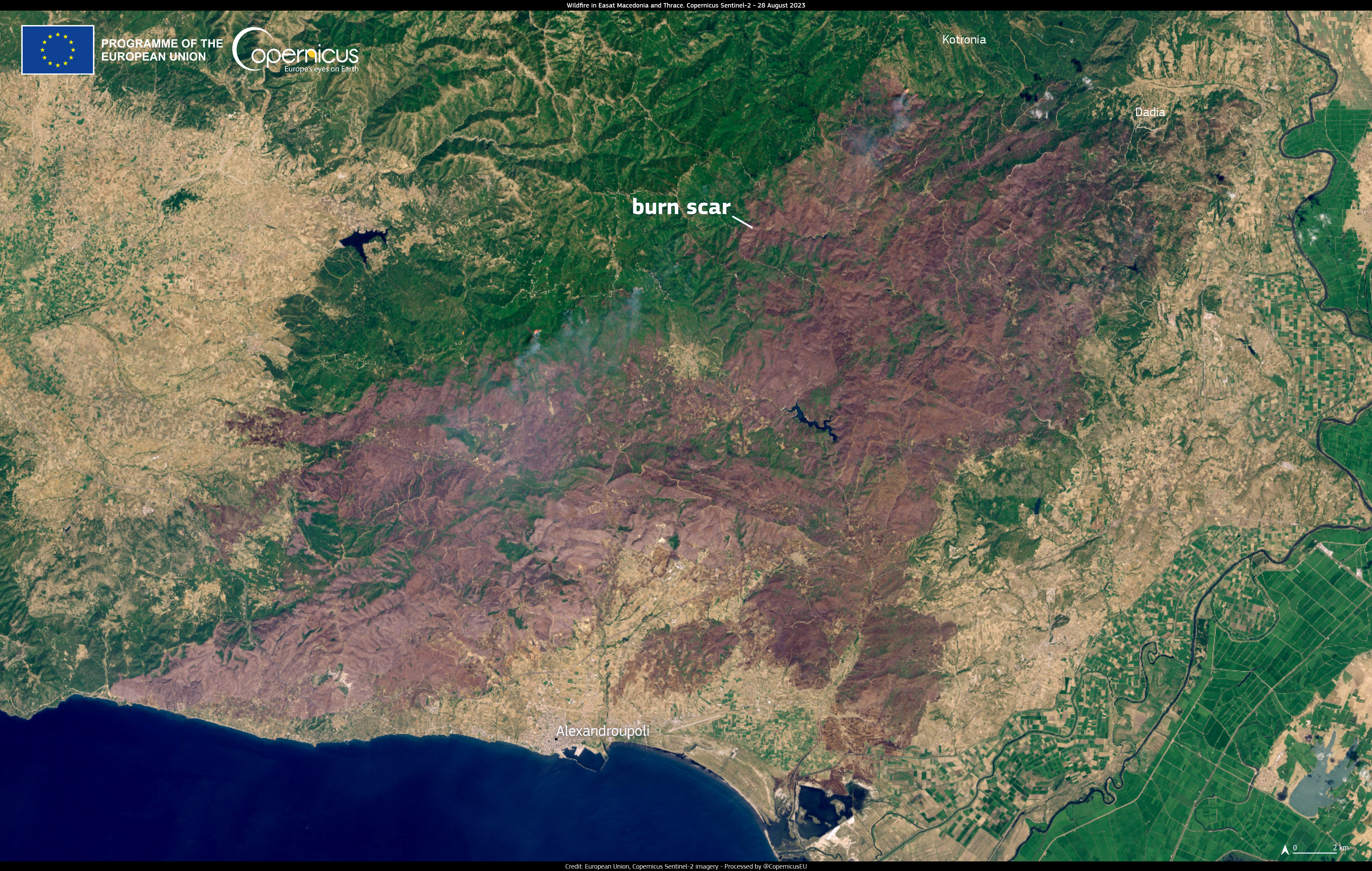
Satellite view of the aftermath of the Evros wildfire, 28 August 2023

A major fire started near the city of Alexandroupolis in eastern Western Thrace on 21 August. The fire was stated to be "the largest recorded in the EU" up to this time by EU officials, with around 73.000 hectares (730 square kilometers) burnt. Most of the burnt area is concentrated in the Dadia Forest. Several migrants died when they got trapped by the flames near the Dadia Forest. As of 28 August the vast majority of the Dadia forest as well as the surrounding pine forests have been destroyed with more than 80,000 hectares (198,000 acres) scorched. On the island of Samothraki a power outage occurred because of the Alexandroupolis fire. The general hospital of Alexandroupolis had to evacuate its patients. The fire had almost reached the hospital.

=== Kavala ===
A major fire was also raging near the city of Kavala.

=== Parnitha ===
There is also a major forest fire near the infamous forest of Parnitha close to Athens. Several homes have been burnt to the ground. Because of the fire most of Athens is experiencing heavy smog. In combination with other major fires in Greece most of Greece is experiencing some form of smog.

== International assistance ==
The European Union announced that more than 450 firefighters and seven airplanes would be deployed to help the situation in Greece, with 81 firefighters, 26 vehicles, and three planes specifically helping the situation in Rhodes.

On 23 July, in response to the wildfires in Rhodes, the UK Government announced that they would deploy a Rapid Deployment Team consisting of responders to support British nationals on the island, being based at Rhodes International Airport.

=== Bulgaria ===
Bulgaria deployed 70 firefighters with 14 vehicles to assist Greece.

=== Czech Republic ===
Czech Republic deployed 79 personnel (firefighters and other), 33 vehicles and a helicopter with 6 personnel.

=== Croatia ===
Croatia deployed a firefighting plane as part of EU assistance.

=== Egypt ===
Three firefighting helicopters were deployed from Egypt.

=== France ===
Two firefighting planes were sent by France.

=== Israel ===
Israel sent two firefighting planes to assist in fighting the fire.

=== Italy ===
Italy sent two firefighting planes as reinforcements.

=== Jordan ===
Jordan sent four firefighting helicopters to Greece.

=== Malta ===
Malta sent 20 firefighters to Greece. This was the first time that Malta had sent firefighters abroad.

=== Poland ===
Poland deployed 149 firefighters, along with 49 firefighting vehicles.

=== Romania ===
Romania sent 130 firefighters, with 25 firefighting vehicles, deployed alongside their Greek counterparts.

=== Serbia ===
Serbia sent 38 firefighters, along with 14 vehicles.

=== Slovakia ===
31 firefighters, along with 15 firefighting vehicles, were deployed from Slovakia.

=== Turkey ===
Two firefighting planes and one helicopter were sent by Turkey at the request of the President.

== Reactions ==
Greek Prime Minister Kyriakos Mitsotakis thanked European civil protection agencies for their assistance in helping the situation.

== Gallery ==
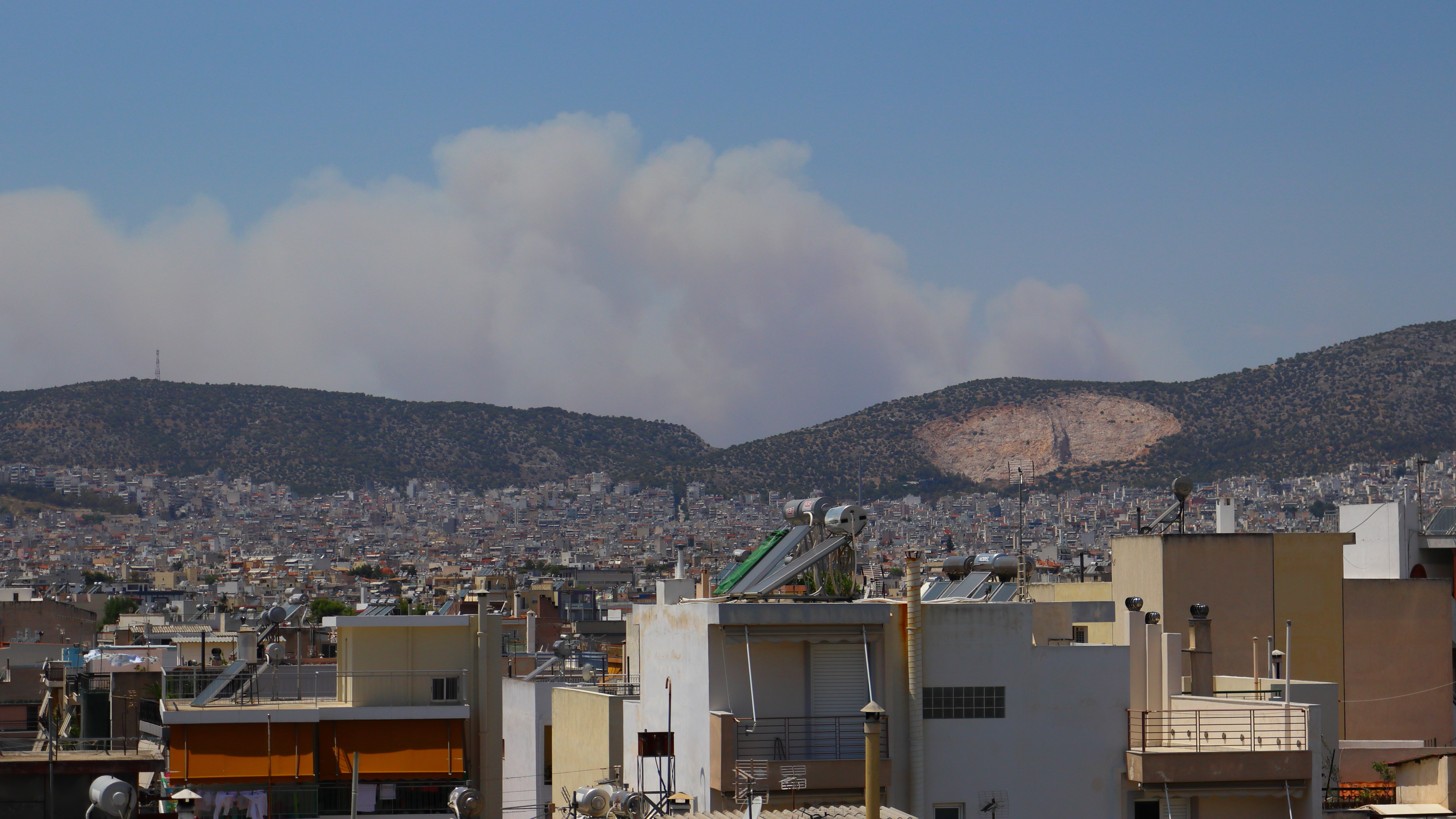
Smoke cloud from the Dervenochoria fire as seen from Ilion at 2:20 pm on 18 July 2023.

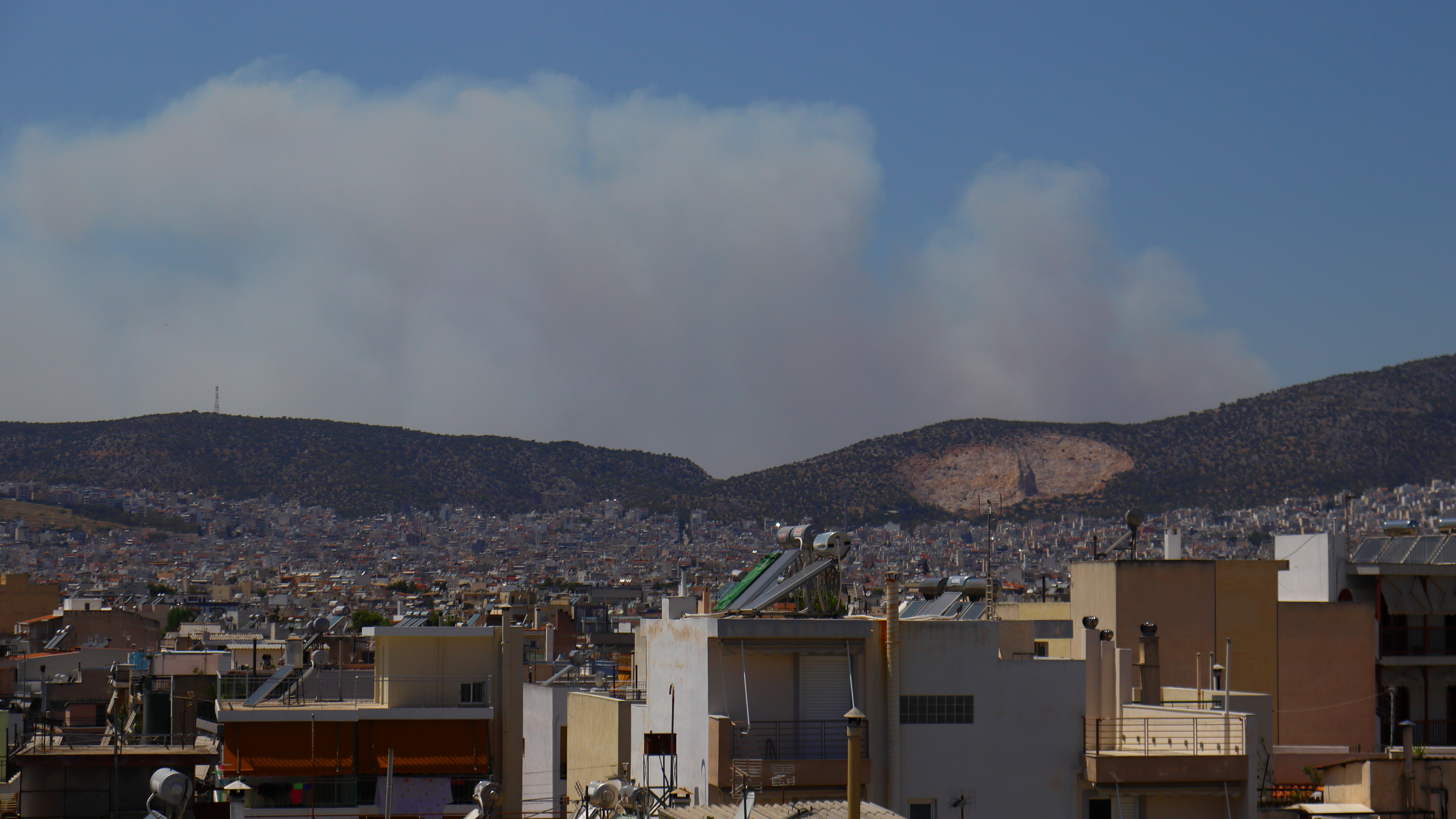
Smoke cloud from Drevenochoria fire as seen at 2:40 pm on 19 July 2023 from Ilion.

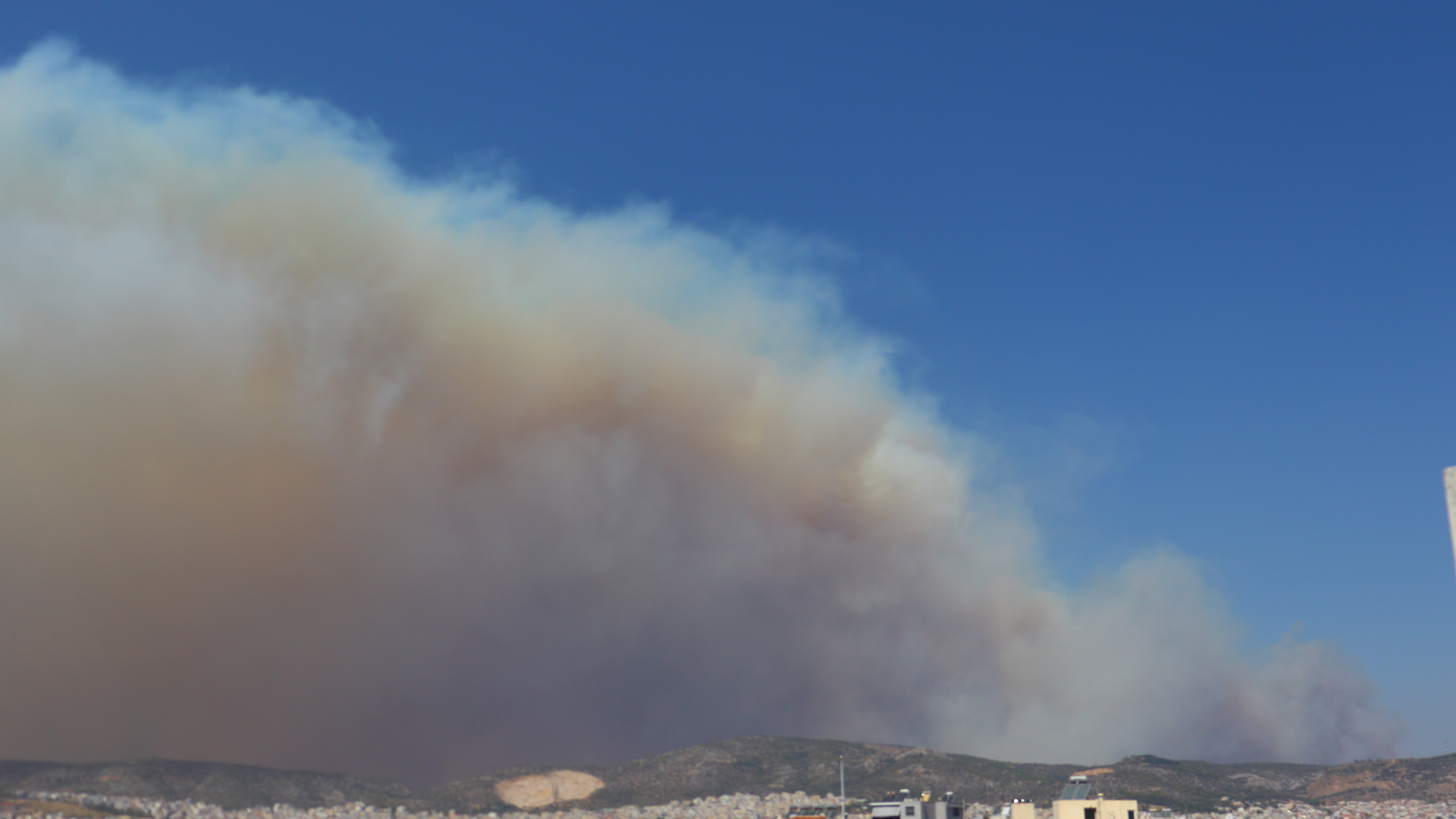
August 22 Fire at approximately 12:50 am, as seen from Ilion, Attica, burning near Fyli emitting large amounts of smoke.

== See also ==
- List of wildfires
- 2007 Greek forest fires
- 2009 Greek forest fires
- 2009 Mediterranean wildfires
- 2012 Chios Forest Fire
- 2018 Attica wildfires
- 2021 Greece wildfires
- 2021 Turkish wildfires
- 2022 European and Mediterranean wildfires
- 2023 Canadian wildfires
- 2023 Hawaii wildfires
