= 2021 Greece wildfires =

2021 forest fires in Greece

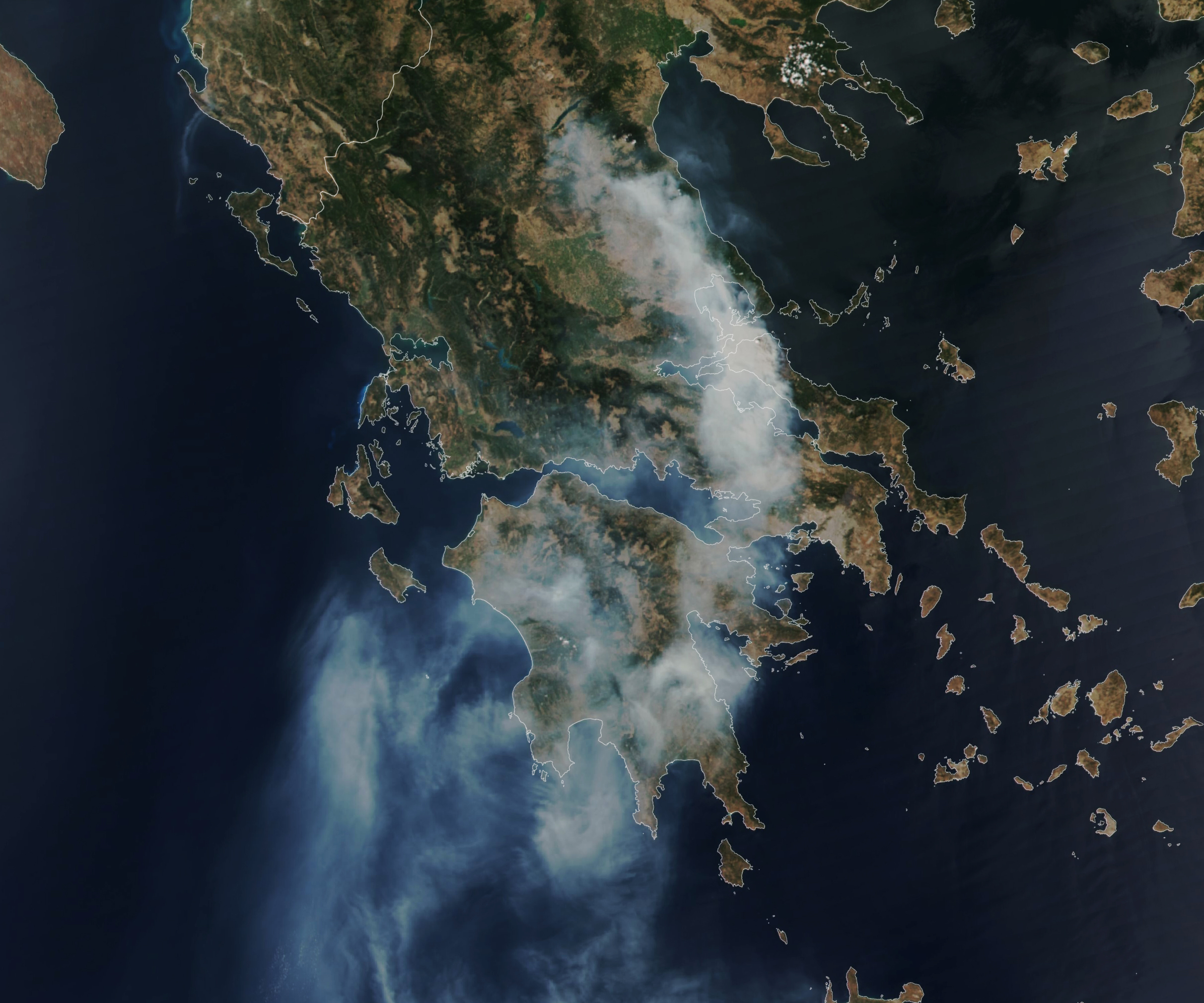
- Satellite image of Greece on August 8, 2021
- Date: 3 August - 3 September
- Location: Euboea, Peloponnese and Attica, Greece

Statistics
- Total fires: 140+
- Total area: 125,000 hectares

Impacts
- Deaths: 3
- Injuries: 20+

Ignition
- Cause: Arson

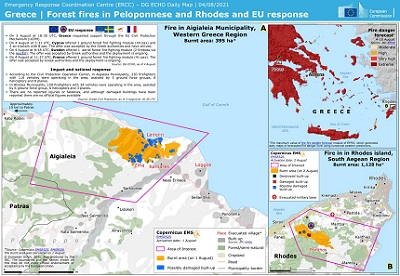
Map of the areas affected by fire in Achaia and Rhodes

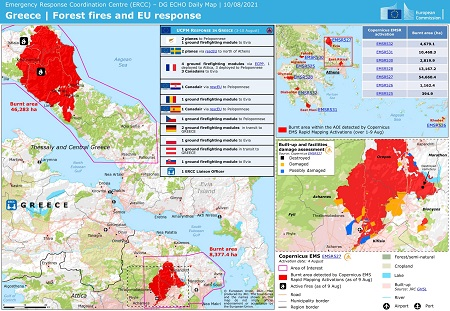
Map of the areas affected in Euboea and Attica

The 2021 Greece wildfires were multiple wildfires in Greece in August 2021, which killed 3 people, injured at least 20 others and burned dozens of homes, after a historic heatwave for the country, with the highest temperatures reaching 47.1 °C (116.8 °F). Authorities evacuated several villages and towns. According to BBC News, Greece experienced the worst heatwave since 1987. These fires were the worst fires in Greece since the 2007 Greek forest fires which burnt more than double the area (270,000 hectares) of the 2021 fires (125,000 hectares).

The largest wildfires were in Attica, Olympia, Messenia, and the most destructive in northern Euboea from which ferries evacuated about 2000 people. In 2021, approximately 125,000 hectares of forest and arable land were burnt during the worst fire season since 2007, with over 50,000 hectares burnt in northern Euboea alone. The World Meteorological Organization connected the fires with the regional heatwave and wildfire season made worse by climate change.

A fire had also broken out in the island of Rhodes a few days before the mass outbreak and resulted in a mass evacuation as well as leaving many people without power or water. Although many farms were destroyed, there were no casualties or burned homes. Several wildfires were also reported in multiple parts of the island of Crete.

== Investigation of causes ==
As of 8 August, 5 people have been arrested for arson in the respective areas of Perama, Kalamata, Messenia, Petroupoli and Philopappou. On 9 August, the prosecutor of Greece's Supreme Court, Vassilios I. Pliotas, called for an investigation into a possible organized arson plot on the part of a "deliberate organized criminal activity" that may have been behind the fires which torched several regions of Greece. As of 9 August, police has arrested 19 people in different places in Greece for attempted arson. As of 10 August, 3 suspected arsonists have been remanded in custody: two Greek men, one for an arson at Petroupoli and the other for an arson at Kryoneri and an Afghan woman for an arson at the Pedion tou Areos. As of 12 August, the number of arrests made by Hellenic Police for arson and negligence causing these wildfires had increased to 118. Minister Michalis Chrisochoidis said the special prosecutor was "already cooperating closely and regularly" with the fire department and the police "for the in-depth investigation of the causes of all the large fires which have broken out this year." Commenting on another fire that had started south of Athens, the minister added, "And all this because, according to witnesses, the fire was due to the use of a flare by one or more" people.

In mid August, a 14 year old boy was arrested by police after they had tracked his movements through video footage. He confessed to police of starting 9 devastating fires in the Phthiotis region, however police suspect him of starting a total of 14. He travelled from location to location starting these fires on his bicycle from 5 August to 17 August.

In 2007, the IPCC Fourth Assessment Report said that "Warmer, drier conditions will lead to more frequent and prolonged droughts, as well as to a longer fire season and increased fire risk, particularly in the Mediterranean region." The fires were some of several extreme weather events around the world in 2021.

== Reactions ==
The Greek Prime Minister Kyriakos Mitsotakis lamented the situation, underlining that Greece's priority is that of saving lives and attributed the fires to the climate change. Mitsotakis also apologized on Monday, 9 August, "for any weaknesses" in containing the massive wildfires that have destroyed swathes of forest land and forced hundreds of people to evacuate numerous settlements over the past week.

The Deputy Minister of Civil Protection, Nikos Hardalias, stated: "The resignations of all the government officials are in the Prime Minister's drawer. Mine is at the very top of the drawer. [...] The state apparatus did what was humanly possible. But, of course, we are not satisfied with such a catastrophe. The Prime Minister is shocked. We all need to apologize to the people who lost their lives and we will evaluate if we could have done something different."

The World Meteorological Organization highlighted the Greek wildfires in its press release response to the IPCC Sixth Assessment Report Working Group I report, noting the wildfires as an example of the extreme weather being caused by climate change.

== International assistance ==
The following countries offered assistance:

- Australia – 4 helicopters
- Austria – 35 firefighters and 11 vehicles
- Croatia – 1 aircraft
- Cyprus – 40 firefighters and 2 aircraft
- Czech Republic – 34 firefighters and 13 vehicles
- Egypt – 3 airplanes
- France – 243 firefighters, 59 vehicles and 3 airplanes
- Germany – 216 firefighters and 44 vehicles
- Israel – 16 firefighters and 3 airplanes
- Kuwait – 45 firefighters, 6 trucks and firefighting equipment
- Moldova – 25 firefighters and 4 vehicles
- Poland – 286 firefighters and 46 trucks
- Qatar – 66 firefighters, 3 vehicles and 1 Search and Rescue team
- Romania – 254 firefighters and 23 trucks
- Russia – 2 aircraft and 2 helicopters
- Serbia – 37 firefighters, 14 members of the Helicopter Unit, 3 helicopters and 13 vehicles
- Slovakia – 75 firefighters and 30 vehicles
- Spain – 2 aircraft
- Sweden – 2 airplanes
- Switzerland – 3 helicopters
- Turkey – 2 airplanes (EU airplanes originally sent to Turkey)
- Ukraine – 100 firefighters
- UAE – 1 group of firefighters and firefighting equipment
- UK – 21 firefighters
- USA – 1 airplane

The following International Organizations offered assistance:

- European Commission – 1 person at the headquarters of the General Secretariat for Civil Protection
- NATO – 20 helicopters

== See also ==
- List of Wildfires
- 2007 Greek forest fires
- 2009 Greek forest fires
- 2009 Mediterranean wildfires
- 2012 Chios Forest Fire
- 2018 Attica wildfires
- 2021 Turkish wildfires
