= 2012 Chios Forest Fire =

Wildfire on the Greek island of Chios

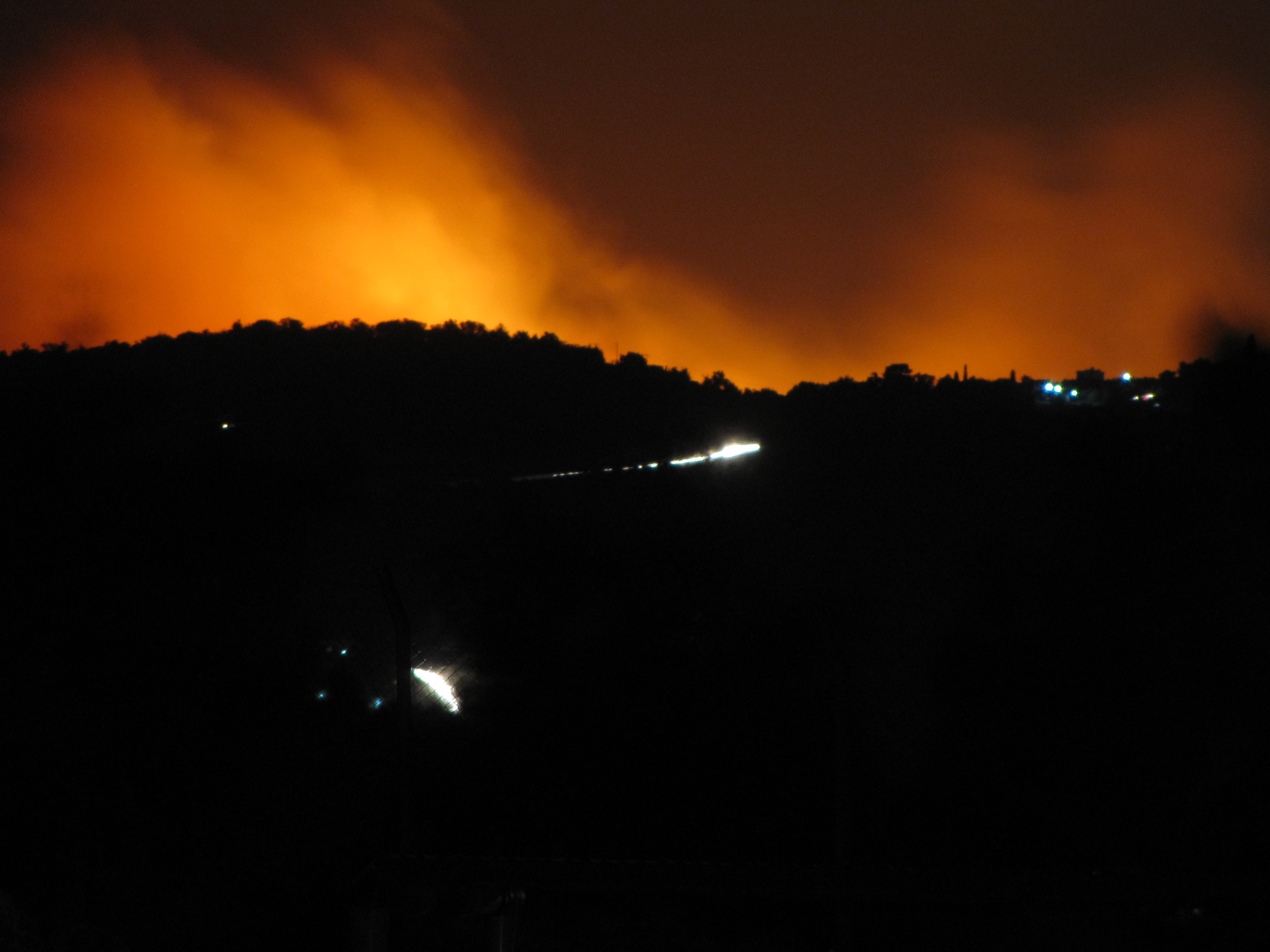
- forest fire in Chios - 2012
- Date: 18 August 2012 – 28 August 2012
- Location: Greece: Chios

Statistics
- Land use: forest, groves of mastic trees (Pistacia lentiscus var. chia)

Ignition
- Cause: heat wave, suggested arson, and wind

The 2012 Chios Forest Fire was a wildfire that broke out in the southern half of the Greek island of Chios shortly after 2 a.m. on Saturday 18 August 2012.

The blaze threatened the army base near Vessas. By the evening of Monday, 20 August 2012, it was reported that a total of nine villages had been evacuated as the fire continued to advance.

That same day, local authorities reported that 7000 hectares (16,000 acres) of forest and farmland had been destroyed. Official reports that day added that many mastic trees in "Mastichochoria" region had been burned, one of few world sources of mastic resin, used in food, cosmetics and medicines. The beekeepers of Chios had lost 60 percent of their hives.

About 360 firefighters, soldiers and volunteers were trying to control and extinguish the fires with the use of water-bombing planes and helicopters as well as 50 vehicles. The Greek government had asked for the help of aircraft from Italy and Spain to help not only with this but six other forest fires that broke out elsewhere in Greece on 19 August and five more on 20 August.

Already on 18 August smoke from the fire was visible as far south as Crete, 350 kilometers (230 miles) away.

== See also ==
- 2009 Greek forest fires
- 2007 Greek forest fires
