= 2009 European and Mediterranean wildfires =

Series of wildfires in southern Europe

2009 Mediterranean wildfires
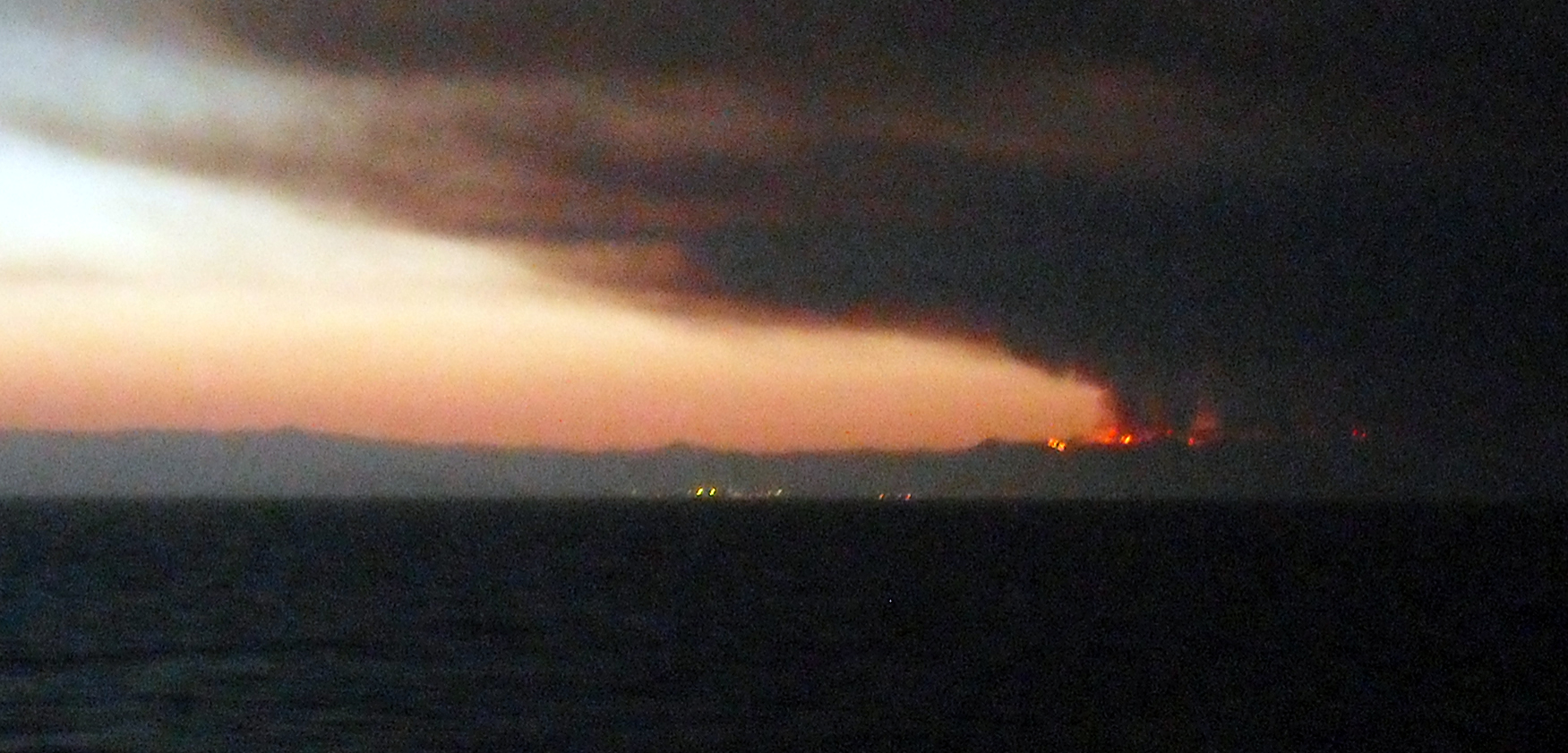
- A wildfire in Mojácar, Spain, on 14 July
- Date: July 2009
- Location: Europe and Anatolia

Statistics
- Land use: Mediterranean forests, woodlands, and scrub

Impacts
- Deaths: 8
- Injuries: 5

Ignition
- Cause: Lightning, arson and ammunition training

There were a series of wildfires that broke out across France, Greece, Italy, Spain, and Turkey in July 2009. Strong winds spread the fire during a hot, dry period of weather killing at least eight people, six of whom were in Spain. Some of the wildfires were caused by lightning, along with arson and military training.

== Effects ==
Four Spanish firefighters died in Catalonia on 21 July, and a fifth member died later from injuries on 23 July, as well as a fire engine driver in Teruel. A further two people died from bush fires in Sardinia. More than 120 people were rescued at Capo Pecora on Sardinia by helicopter and civil protection boats. The Arenas prison complex was evacuated and the inmates were temporarily transferred to the beach.

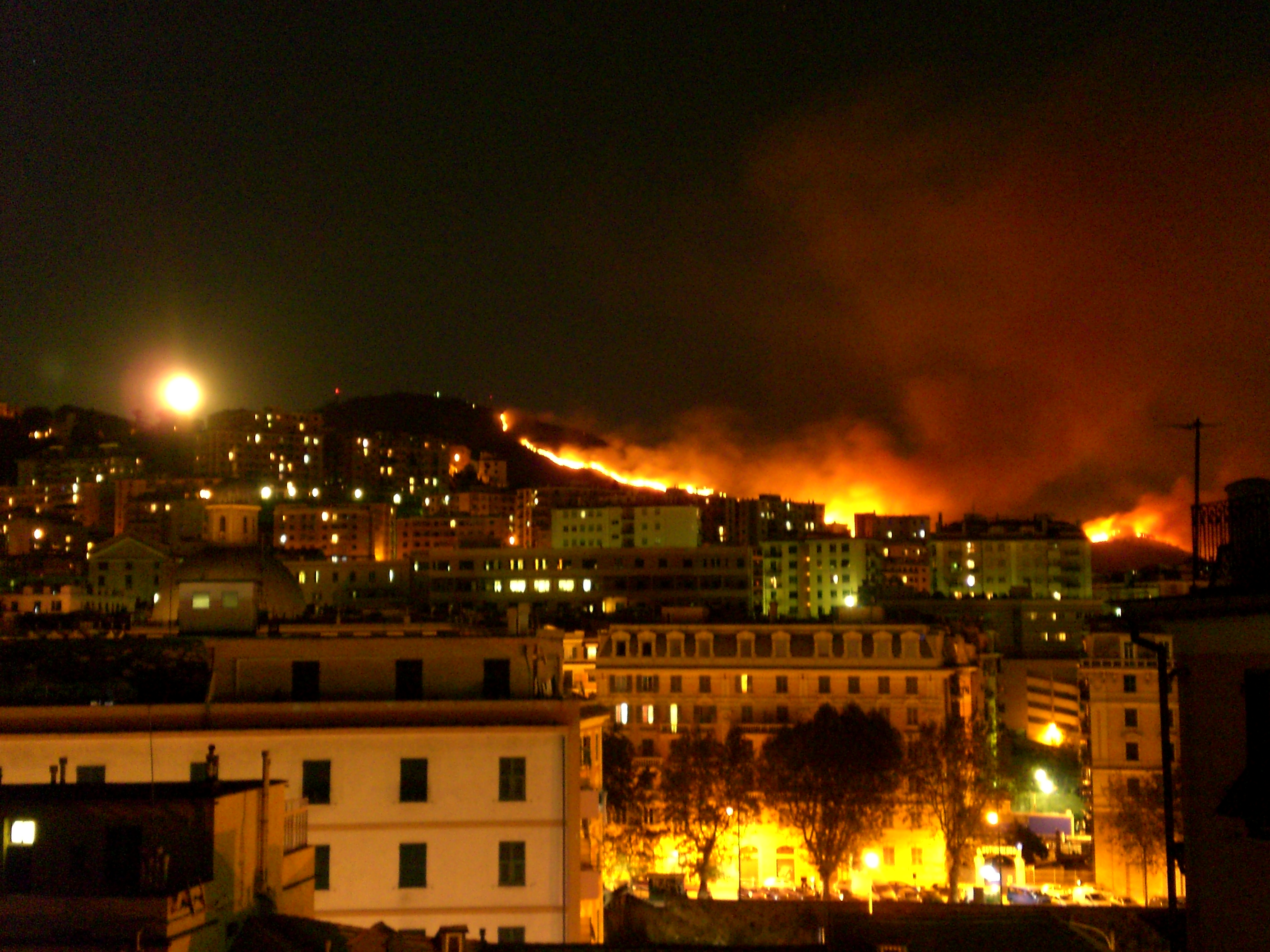
Wildfire near Genoa, Italy, in September

Northern and central Spain saw temperatures of around 40 °C (104 °F) on 21 July. Around 2,000 people were evacuated from hills around the town of Collado Mediano, near Madrid. Aircraft with water and firefighters controlled the fire.

Estimates suggest that 5,000 hectares of forest and bush were affected in the Sierra Cabrera mountain range between Turre and Mojácar in Spain on 14–15 July. 500 people were evacuated, as dozens of firefighters and soldiers controlled the fires, including the use of five helicopters and three aircraft. On 23 July, the fires on the Sierra Cabrera on which Mojácar sits flared again, causing damage to the village and other houses in the area and the evacuation of around 1,500 residents.

Outside the French city of Marseille, 1,300 hectares (3211 acres) were destroyed. In Corsica, wildfires led to the destruction of approximately 4,000 hectares (10,000 acres) of bush and forest resulting in the injuries of five firemen.

More than 320 wildfires affected patches of forest across Greece, although they did affect buildings. Most of them were located on the island of Euboea and the southern Peloponnese.

On 23 July, over 15 hectares of land were destroyed in a landfill site in Bodrum, southwestern Turkey. Over 200 volunteers and 100 firefighters tried to contain the fires across Turkey, which saw temperatures of 48 °C (118 °F) on 25–26 July.

== Causes ==
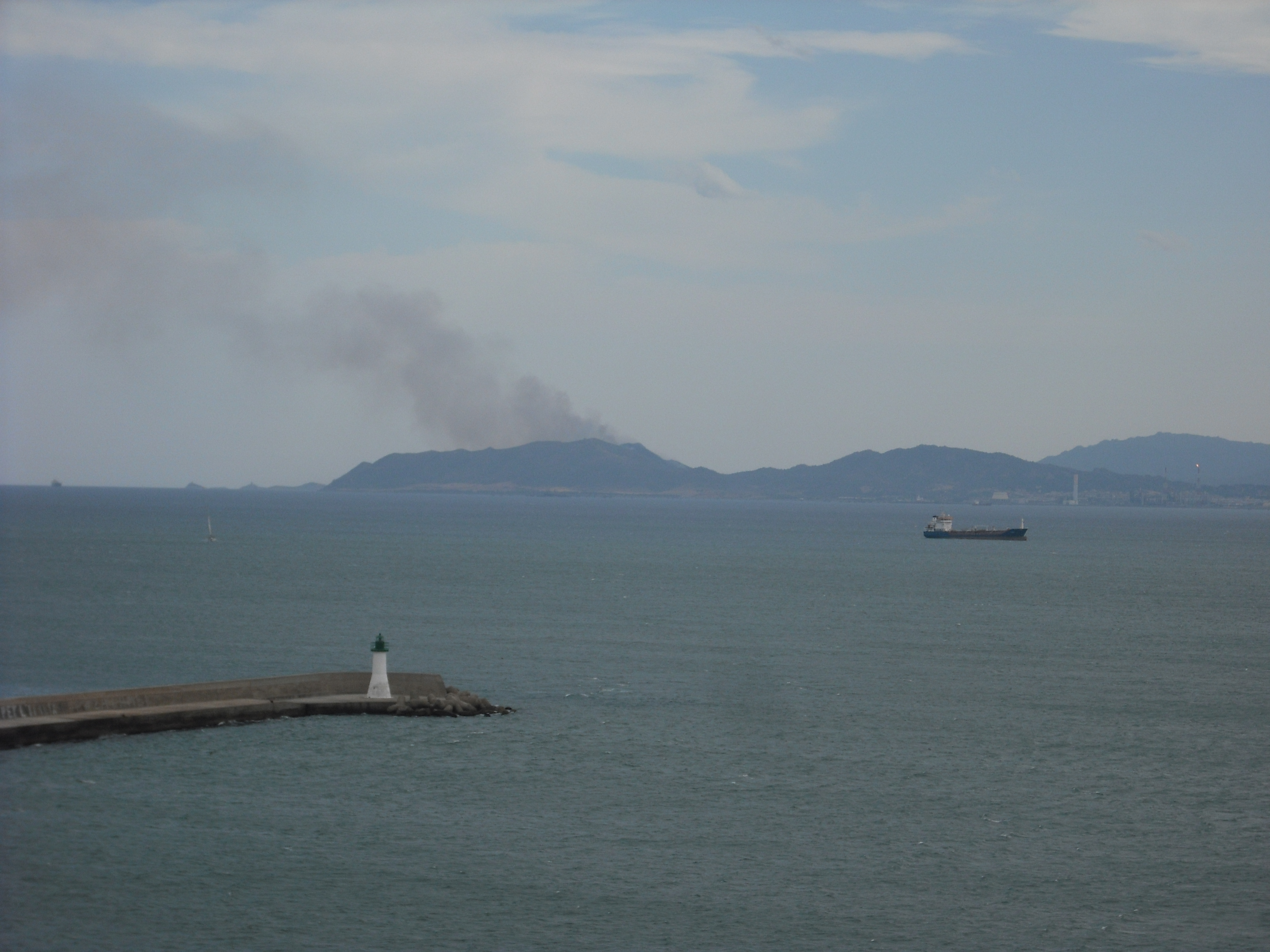
Fire in Cagliari, Sardinia

In the Mediterranean region, the current fire frequency due to human activity is considered much larger than the natural rate. 95% of forest fires in Spain are human-induced. The 2009 Mediterranean wildfires occurred during a particularly hot and dry summer period, increasing the risk of wildfires burning out of control once ignited. Temperatures peaked at 44 °C (111 °F) in mainland Spain and reached 37 °C (99 °F) in Gran Canaria. These conditions, combined with insufficient fire-fighting resources and an inadequate official response in some of the affected countries, exacerbated the extent of the damage.

Uncontrolled legal and illegal scrub burning by farmers is a major cause of forest fires in the Mediterranean region. Arson, while still a significant factor, has diminished in Spain and Greece in recent years. Decreasing property values generally and the introduction of legislation in Spain to tackle the issue has diminished the financial incentive to illegally clear forested land for development by burning. Isolated cases of areas in Spain affected by fires caused by lightning strikes include Aragon (Spain), as reported by El País and Mojácar, as suggested by the Spanish Forest Fire Organisation (INFOCA). The wildfires outside of Marseille, France, were reported as being caused by military training using tracer bullets. The local government of Corsica believed the fires were caused by arson.

== See also ==
- 2009 Greek forest fires
- 2022 European and Mediterranean wildfires
- 2025 European and Mediterranean wildfires
