= 2007 Greek forest fires =

Series of forest fires across Greece throughout summer 2007

- Animation showing fires in southern Greece (22–26 August 2007), from NASA satellite images.
- Date: 28 June 2007 - 3 September 2007
- Location: Greece: Peloponnese, Attica and Euboea

Statistics
- Burned area: 270,000 hectares (2,700 square kilometres; 1,000 square miles)acres

Impacts
- Deaths: June: 9 July: 5 August: 67 September: 4 Total: 85
- Injuries: Exact number unknown - number believed to be several dozen people.

Ignition
- Cause: heat wave, arson, and wind

The 2007 Greek forest fires were a series of massive forest fires that broke out in several areas across Greece throughout the summer of 2007. The most destructive and lethal infernos broke out on 23 August, expanded rapidly and raged out of control until 27 August, until they were finally put out in early September. The fires mainly affected western and southern Peloponnese as well as southern Euboea. The death toll in August alone stood at 67 people. In total 85 people lost their lives because of the fires, including several fire fighters.

Some of these firestorms are believed to be the result of arson while others were merely the result of negligence. Hot temperatures, including three consecutive heat waves of over 40 °C (104 °F), and severe drought rendered the 2007 summer unprecedented in modern Greek history. From the end of June to early September, over 3,000 forest fires were recorded across the nation. Nine more people were killed in blazes in June and July.

A total of 2,700 square kilometers (670,000 acres) of forest, olive groves and farmland were destroyed in the fires, which was the worst fire season on record in the past 50 years. Of the total of 2,700 km^{2}, 1,500 km^{2} (370,000 acres) were burnt forests in Southern Greece alone which meant that 4% of Greece's total forest area burnt in 2007 alone. Many buildings were also destroyed in the blaze. The fire destroyed 1,000 houses and 1,100 other buildings, and damaged hundreds more.

== Timeline ==
=== June ===
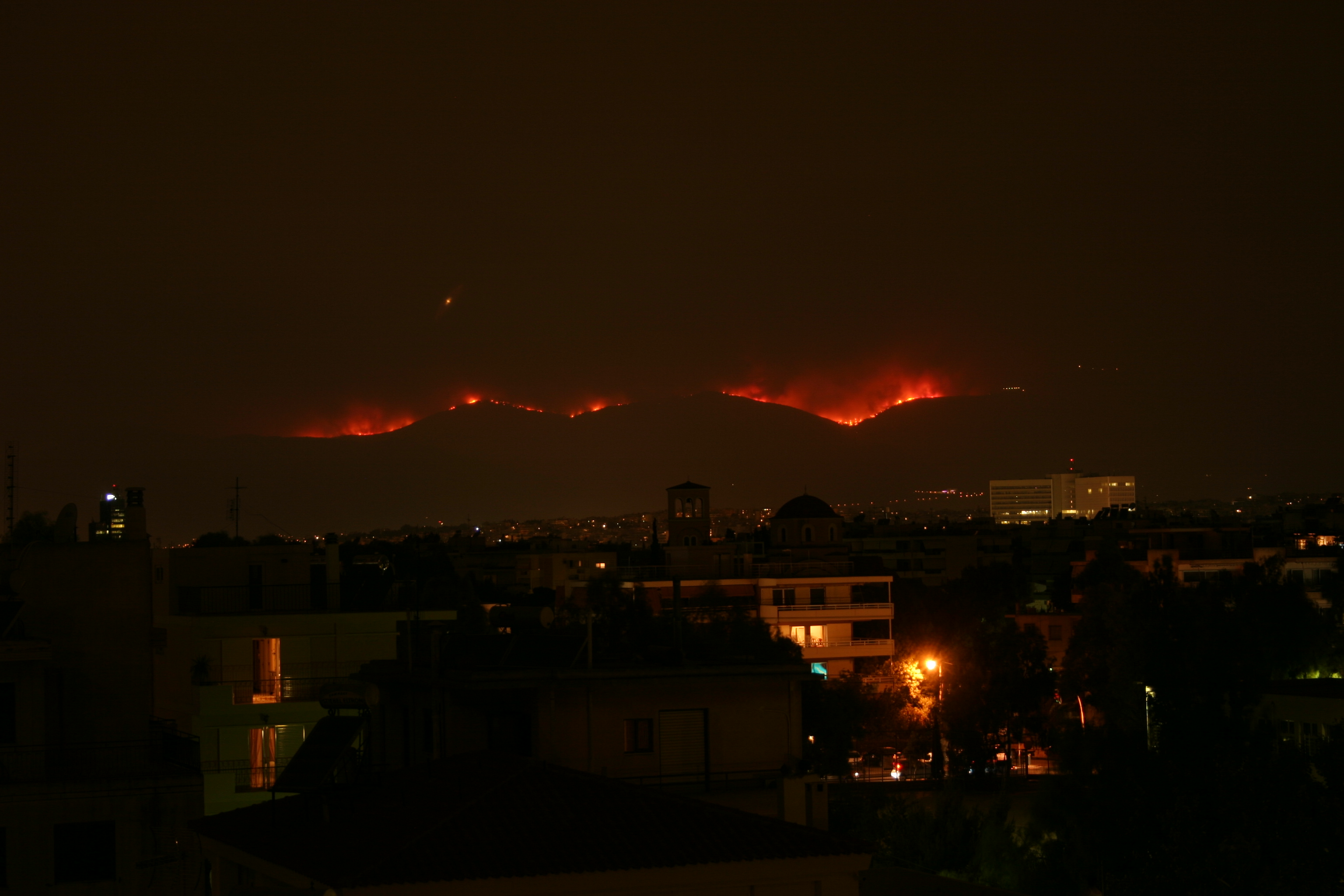
View of the Parnitha National Park fire from north Athens

The first major fire of the summer of 2007 was started on 28 June 2007. It is perceived to have been started by either an exploding electrical pylon or by arsonists. Significant parts of the Parnitha National Park were destroyed, and in total, the fire burnt 15,723 acres (63.6 km^{2}) of the core of the national forest in a matter of days. Overall, the mountain of Parnitha suffered a burnt area of 38,000 acres (153.8 km^{2}), making it one of the worst recorded wildfires in Attica since the Penteli fire of July 1995.

The magnitude of the devastation was unforeseen. Environmental studies in Greece report that the Athenian microclimate will significantly change to warmer during the summer season, and flooding is now a very probable danger for the northern suburbs of the city. Mount Parnitha was considered the 'lungs' of Athens; following its considerable burning, both the city and local flora and fauna are expected to feel the consequences. Other affected areas included Pelion, Agia and Melivoia, Skourta, Dafni, and Pyli.

=== July ===
On 11 July 2007, another wildfire sparked at a garbage dump near Agia Paraskevi, Skiathos, and spread across the island. Residents and tourists were forced to evacuate to nearby Troulos, and returned after the fire was put out. More than 100 fires were reported by 15 July 2007, in such locations as Keratea outside of Athens, Peloponnese, and on the Aegean islands of Andros, Evia, Lesbos, and Samos, as well as Crete and the Ionian island of Kefalonia.

In Peloponnese around 20 July 2007, a fire which started from the mountains over the town of Aigio expanded rapidly towards Diakopto and Akrata, destroyed a large area of forests and cultivated land. In the same fire many villages were totally or partially burned, resulting in the loss of 230 houses and 10 churches; three people lost their lives. A 26-year-old farmer and a 77-year-old woman were arrested on suspicion of arson concerning the fires in Aigio and Diakopto. The farmer confessed and is currently held in prison.

=== August ===
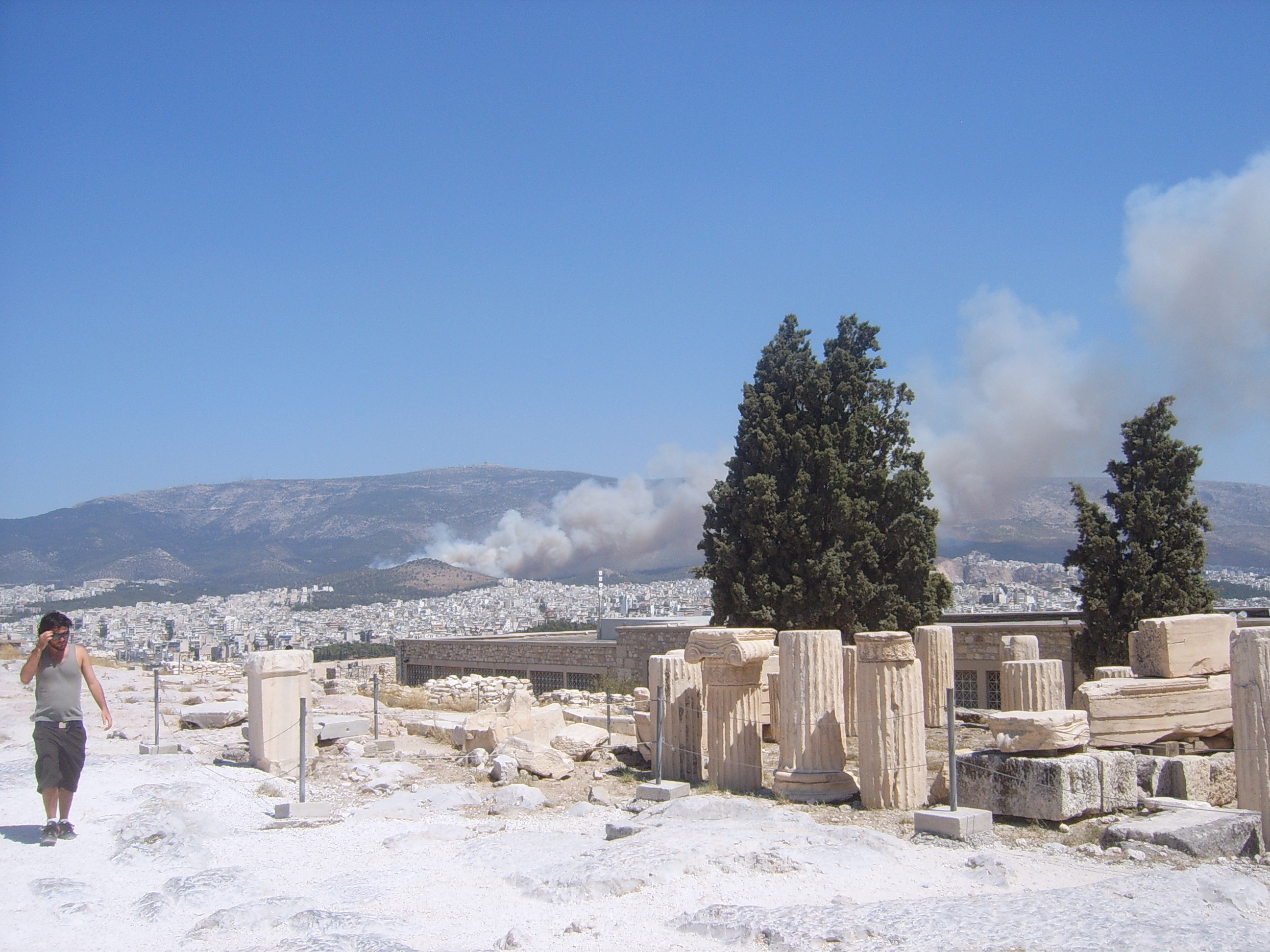
Forest fire in the suburbs of Athens on 16 July

Fires continued, on 17 August 2007 they started to burn on the outskirts of Athens. The fire started on Mt. Penteli began burning down towards the suburbs. More than sixty fire engines, nineteen planes and helicopters, and hundreds of firefighters as well as locals attempted to hold back the fire. Melisia, Vrilisia, and Penteli city were affected in the blaze that was put out once winds calmed down.

On 24 August 2007, fires broke out in Peloponnese, Attica and Euboea. In Peloponnese, the fire burnt many villages and accounted for 60 deaths. Six people were reported to have been killed in the town of Areopoli. In Zacharo, one of the worst hit areas, more than 30 people were found dead by firefighters while searching burning cars and homes.

Prime Minister Kostas Karamanlis declared a state of emergency for the whole country and requested help from fellow members of the European Union. Multiple countries responded to the call and sent help. Additionally, 500 Greek soldiers were sent in the affected areas. Another 500 Greek soldiers were called up bringing the total to 1,000 military personnel involved in the fire fighting.

On 25 August 2007, fires broke out on Mount Hymettus and in the suburb of Filothei in Athens. Officials said these fires were the result of arson, as the firefighters found many bottles with gasoline in affected areas. Arson is also suspected for the fires in Peloponnese, as more than 20 fires started at about the same time. Two fires broke out in Keratea and one in Markopoulo Mesogaias in East Attica on 25 August 2007. The first fire was not under control until the following day, while the second was put out quickly. The Keratea fire had a length of 12 kilometres (7 mi) and a man was hospitalised with second degree burns. The fire at Lagonissi was reported as an accident, as they were started when a man accidentally set fire to a tree in his garden.

==== The fires at Olympia ====
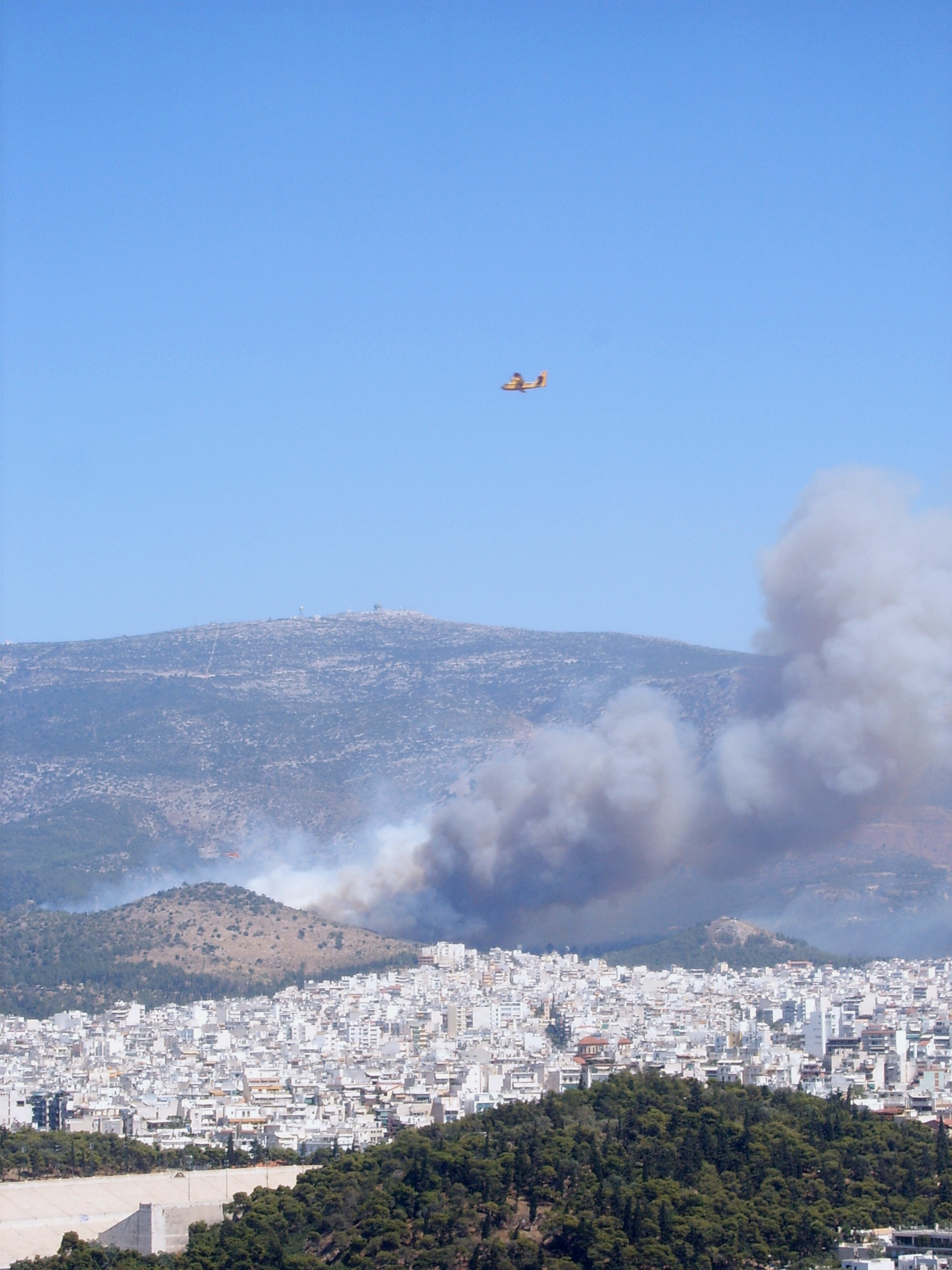
Smoke seen from the Acropolis, Athens.

Olympia, site of the ancient Olympics and World Heritage Site, was evacuated on 26 August 2007. Fears were expressed for the survival of the ruins of ancient Olympia lying near the raging fire. The famous statue of Hermes of Praxiteles and nearby antiquities were spared from the fire, but the yard of the museum where the statue is housed was scorched. According to the official statement of former Minister of Culture Georgios Voulgarakis, no serious damage was caused to the antiquities. The fire burnt all the trees on the hilltop above, and an area of brush and open space adjacent to the Olympic Academy. The fire did not damage the archaeological museum nor did it damage the several ancient structures in the area. "The wider archaeological space of Olympia remains intact," stated Mr. Voulgarakis. Despite the Minister's claims, it has been established, as of 26 August, that the afflicted damage is of greater importance and scale; the sacred Hill of Kronos was totally burnt during the blaze. The hill was left blackened, but will soon be reforested. New Culture Minister Michalis Liapis has stated that 3,200 bushes and saplings will be planted on the Hill of Kronos, to return the area to its previous appearance.

=== September ===
The fires continued to burn into early September. On 1 September 2007, firefighters were still suppressing a strong blaze in Peloponnese. Three blazes remained, with the fires destructive path continuing in Arcadia and Mt. Parnon in Laconia. Then, on 3 September 2007 a lightning strike started a new fire on Mt. Vermion, which was soon brought under control by firefighters. On 5 September the death toll reached 67, and on 21 September reached 68.

== International assistance ==
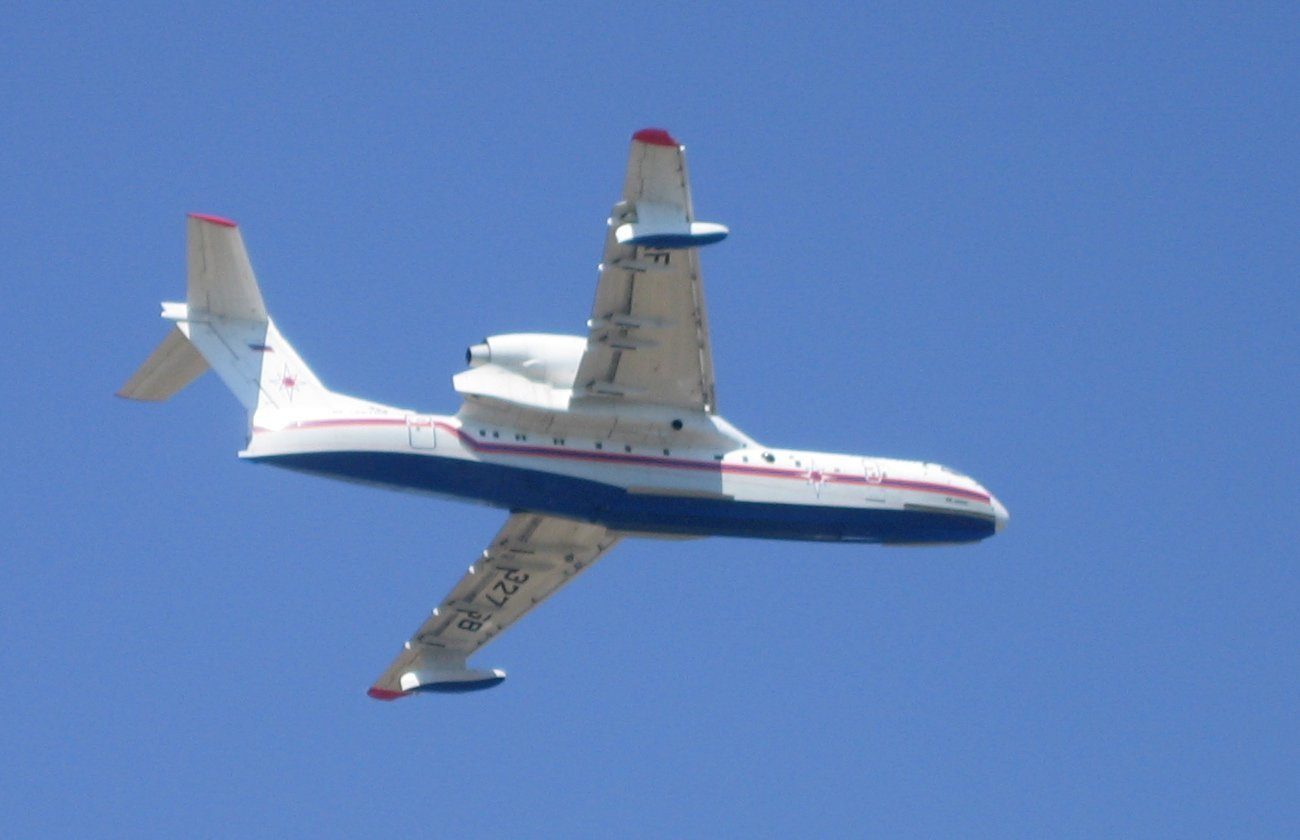
A Beriev Be-200 operating in Athens.

When the August fires broke out, Prime Minister Kostas Karamanlis requested help from the members of the European Union and other nations. The following countries offered help, but some offers were refused:

- Austria – Two helicopters, two planes, one transport plane, and 20 firefighters.
- Canada - Four Canadair CL-215 water bombers and two spotter planes from the provinces of Alberta and Manitoba and one Martin Mars bomber along with a Cessna L-19 spotter plane from British Columbia.
- Croatia - Two Canadair CL-415 firefighting aircraft.
- Cyprus – 12 firefighting vehicles, 98 firefighters, 29 civil defense personnel.
- Czech Republic – One helicopter with a five-member crew. (Declined.)
- Denmark – Six firefighting all-terrain vehicles, which are able to scale steep slopes.
- Finland – Three helicopters, 25 firefighters and 2-3 forest fire experts. (Declined as the equipment was not suitable - Finland assisted in reconstruction instead.)
- France – Four Canadair CL-415 water bombers, 60 firefighters who specialize in helicopter operations, six firefighting vehicles.
- Germany – Three CH-53 water-carrying helicopters.
- Hungary – Two fire engines, 18 firefighters, one doctor, as well as additional equipment.
- Israel – Three helicopters and 55 firefighters.
- Italy – One Canadair CL-415 water-tanker plane.
- Netherlands – Three Eurocopter AS 532 firefighting helicopters and 27 crew members.
- Norway – One Bell 214 firefighting helicopter.
- Portugal – One Canadair CL-215 water bomber and six personnel.
- Romania – One Mil Mi-17 helicopter with a nine-member crew and one airplane.
- Russia – Five Kamov Ka-27 helicopters, six Mil Mi-26 helicopters, two Mil Mi-8 helicopters, and a Beriev Be-200 water-tanker plane.
- Serbia – Six M-18 Dromader and one Antonov An-2 firefighting planes, 6 firefighting all-terrain vehicles and 55 firefighters. The army was on alert for deployment to assist. City of Novi Sad sent a team of 11 firefighters.
- Slovenia – One water-carrying helicopter.
- Spain – Two Canadair CL-215 water bombers.
- Sweden – One Bell-205 firefighting helicopter.
- Switzerland – Four Eurocopter Super Puma water-carrying helicopters.
- Turkey – One Canadair CL-215 water bomber.

== List of affected areas ==
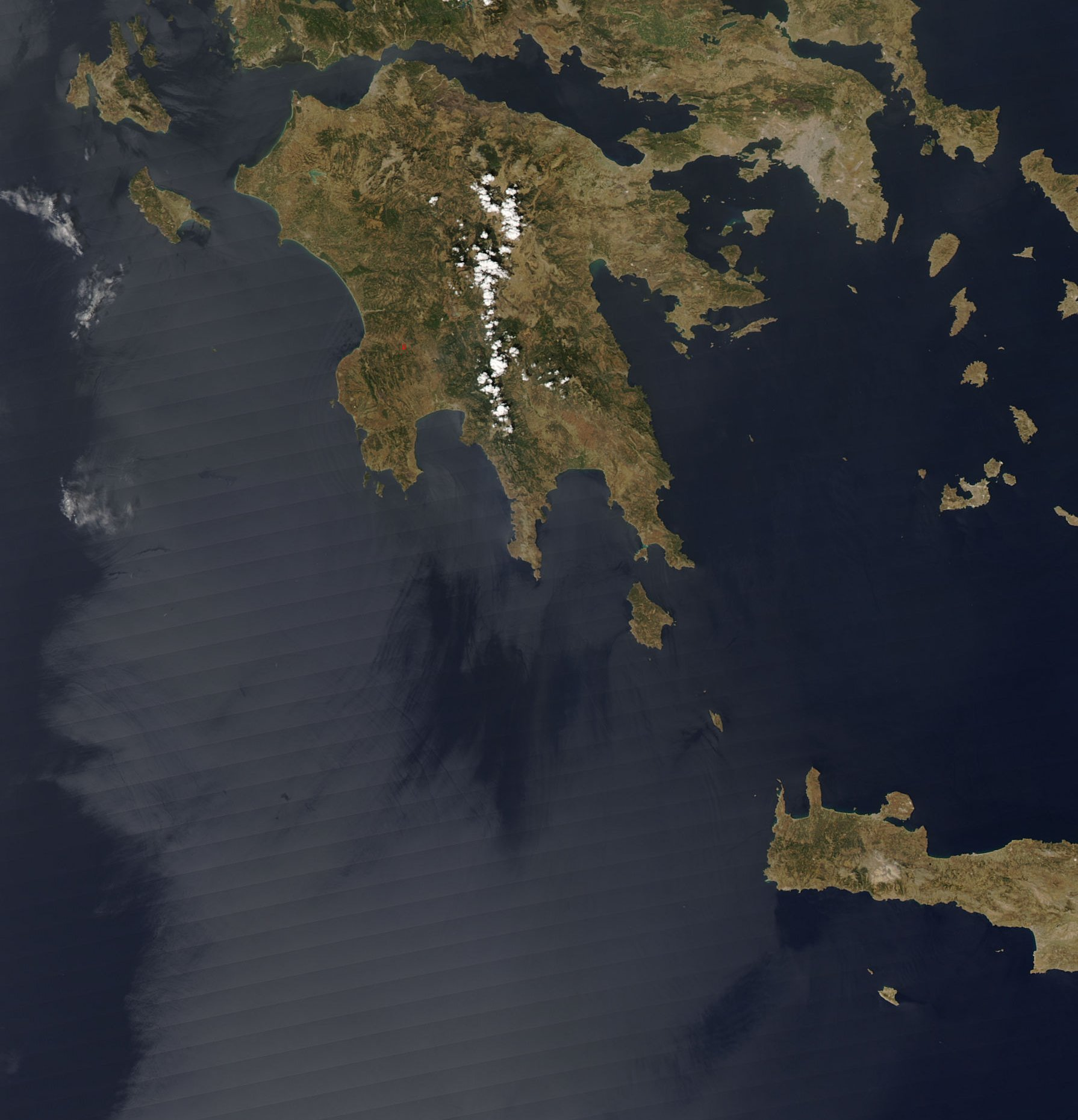
Rapidfire – NASA image taken on 22 August, before the fires

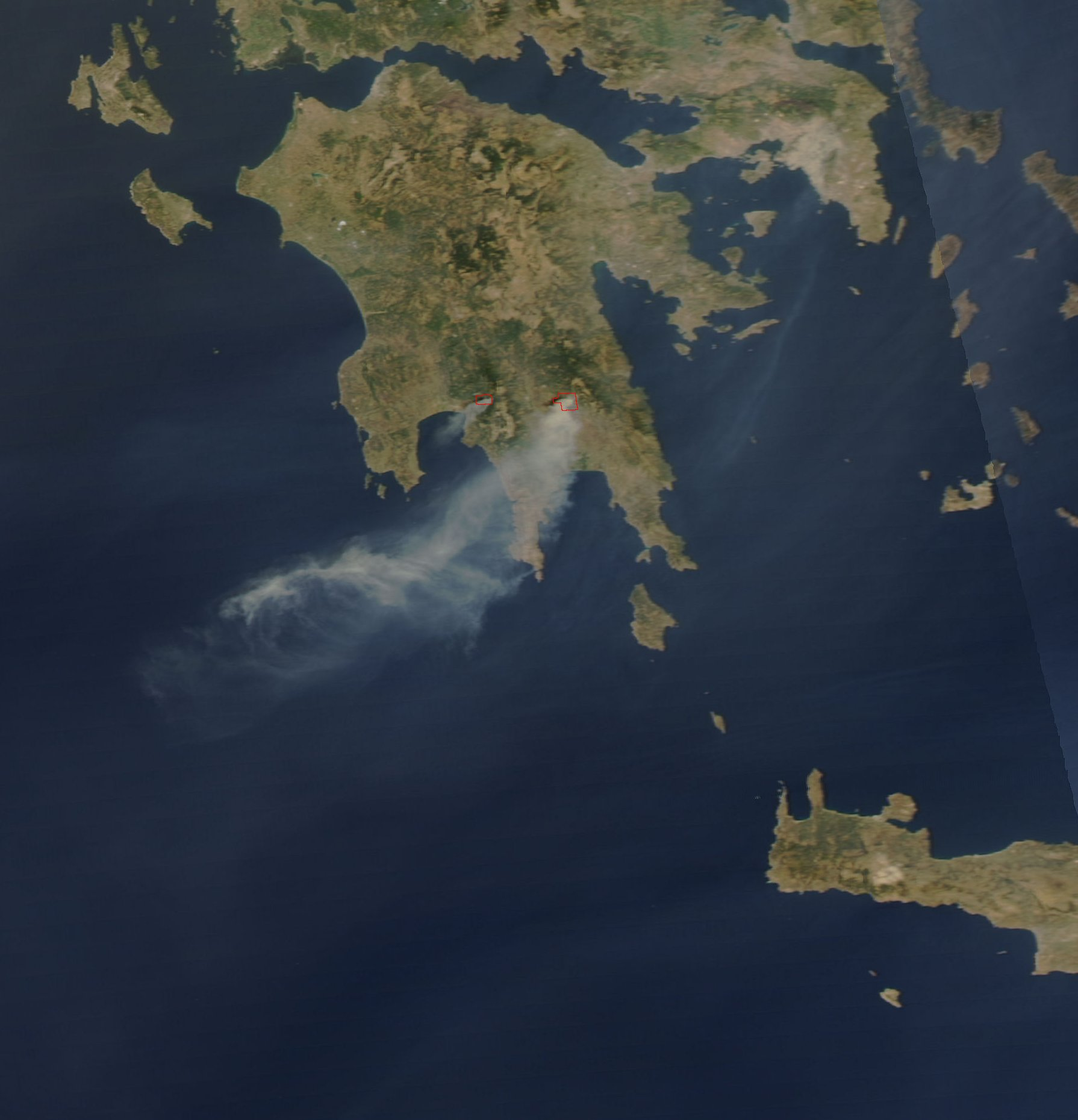
Rapidfire – NASA image of the fires, taken on 23 August

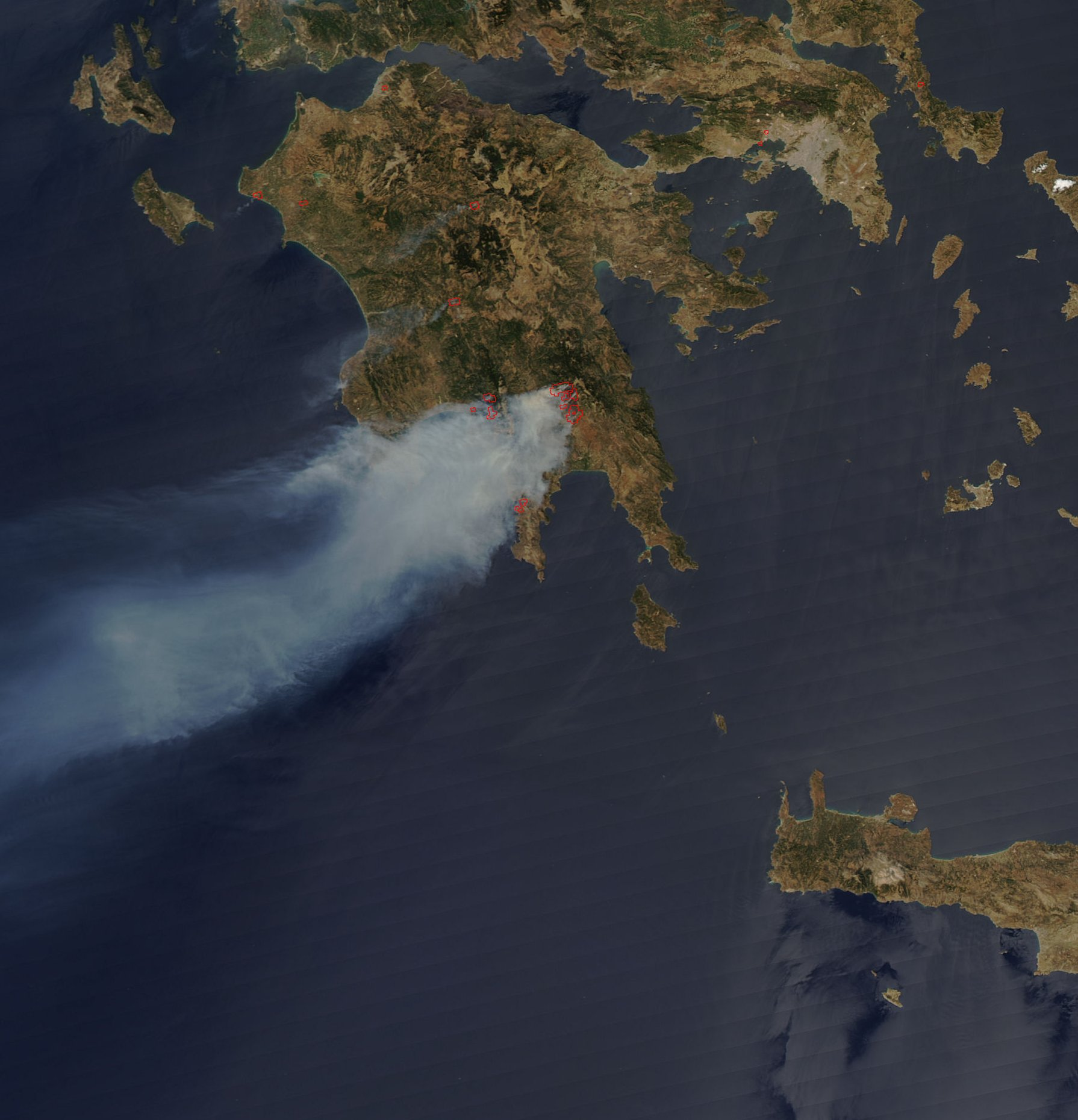
Rapidfire – NASA image of the fires, taken on 24 August

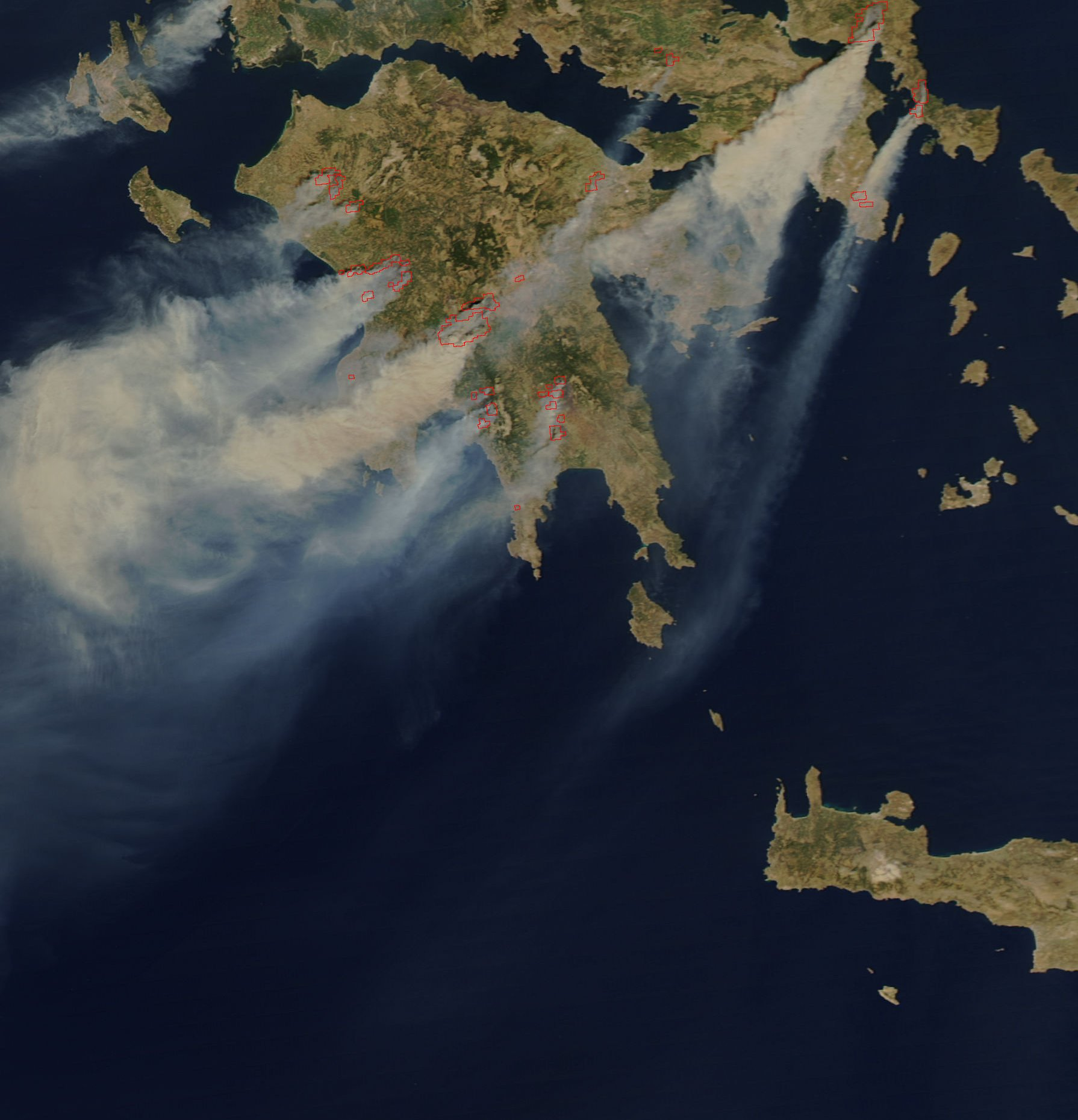
Rapidfire – NASA image of the fires, taken on 25 August

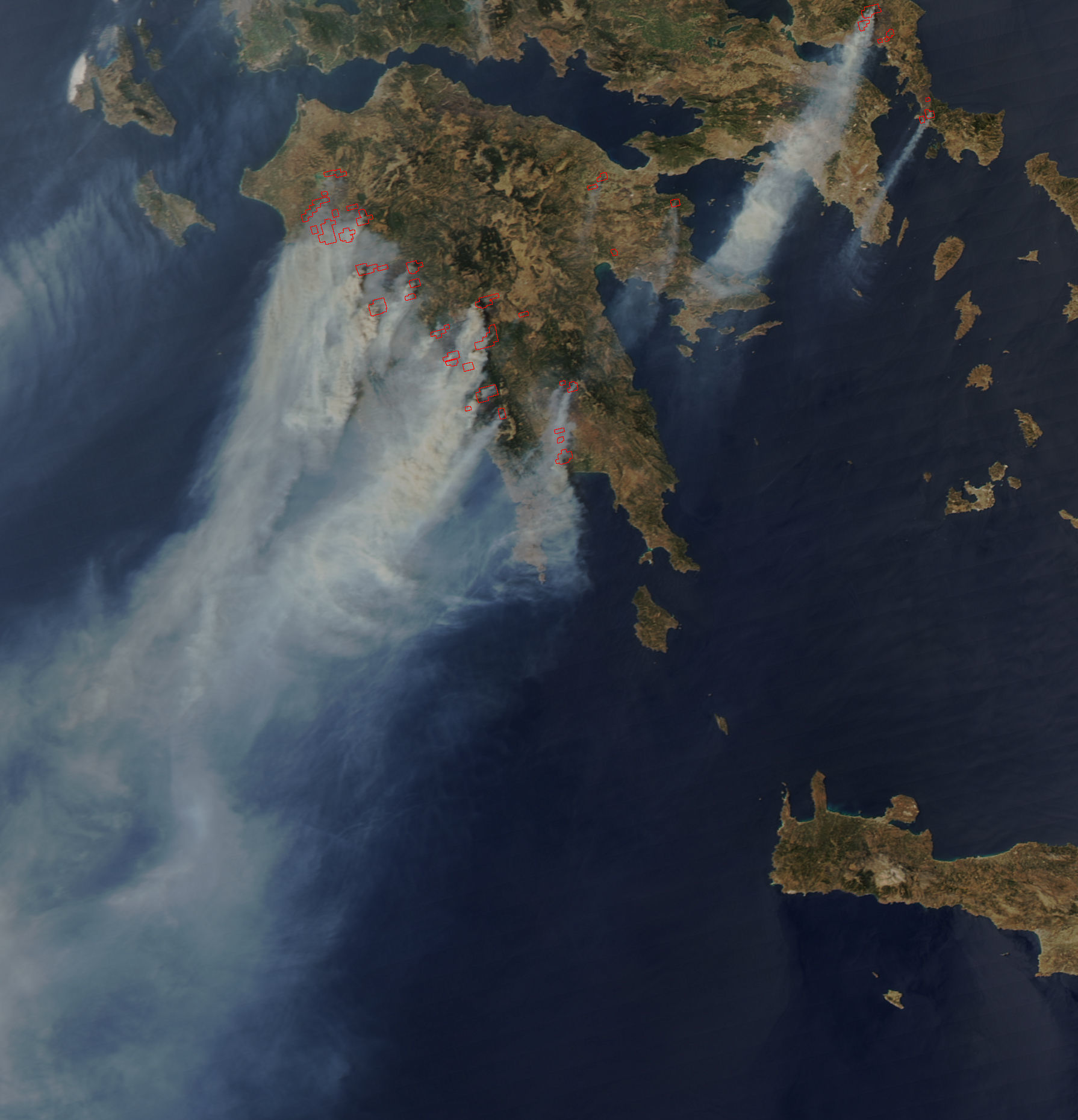
Rapidfire – NASA image of the fires, taken on 26 August

- Achaea
  - Aigio
  - Diakopto
  - Akrata
  - Leontio
  - Kalavryta
  - Kallithea, Achaea
  - Patras
- Aetolia-Acarnania
  - Astakos
  - Palaiochoraki Nafpaktias
- Aegean Islands
  - Skiathos
  - Lesbos
  - Crete
- Arcadia
  - Anemodouri
  - Leontari
  - Akovos
  - Veligosti
  - Mallota
  - Manthyrea
- Attica
  - Athens
  - Grammatiko
  - Mt. Parnitha
  - Mt. Imittos
  - Mt. Penteli
  - Keratea
  - Lagonissi
- Corinthia
  - Chiliomodi
  - Sofiko
  - Mapsos
- East Attica
  - Kalyvia Thorikou
- Elis
  - Ampelona
  - Ancient Olympia
  - Andritsaina
  - Chelidonio
  - Dafnoula
  - Figaleia
  - Giannitsochori
  - Koliri
  - Oleni
  - Pelopio
  - Pineia
  - Skillounta
  - Zacharo
- Euboea
  - Aliveri
  - Amarynthos
  - Marmari
  - Styra
- Imathia
  - Vermion Mountains
- Laconia
  - Areopoli
  - Skala
  - Krokees
  - Geraki
  - Gerolimenas
  - Oitylo
- Messenia
  - Kalamata
  - Filiatra
  - Meligalas
  - Pylos
  - Aetos, Messenia
    - Christianous
    - Gargalianoi
- Phthiotis
  - Leianokladi

== Aftermath ==
=== Causes and arson arrests ===
"The reward is set between €100,000 and €1,000,000 ($1.36 million US dollars) for every [act of] arson, depending on whether death or serious injury occurred and the size of the damage."

— Vyron Polydoras

The former Minister for Public Order, Vyron Polydoras, stated the fires may be a result of terrorist attacks, as many of the fires started simultaneously and in places where an arsonist could not be seen. He also stated that the country is facing an asymmetric threat, a military term used for terrorist attacks.

While some fires are believed to have been caused by environmental factors, others clearly were not. The fires could have been deliberately started as a way to get around Greek law which forbids property development on areas designated as forest land and to pull benefit from Greece's unique position as the only EU country without a full land registry system. A substantial reward has been offered for anyone providing information which leads to the arrest of an arsonist.

Greek police announced the capture of three arson suspects: A 65-year-old man from Areopolis was charged with arson and murder relating to the fire which killed at least 6 in this area. Also, in northern Kavala, two youths had been detained on suspicion of arson. Greek government press minister Theodoros Roussopoulos confirmed on 27 August that 61 people had been arrested on suspicion of involvement in arson, seven of these being retained in custody.

On 27 August 2007, PASOK leader George Papandreou accused the government of insinuating that his party is involved in the fires and called on Prime Minister Kostas Karamanlis to produce any evidence that would support there was such an organized plan. Heavy criticism directed towards the government for its handling of the crisis, with the Greek press forming a chorus in ridiculing the incompetence of the country's officials, was accentuated in September by the reported discovery of steps aimed at giving a green light to property developers in the ravaged region.

=== Consequences ===
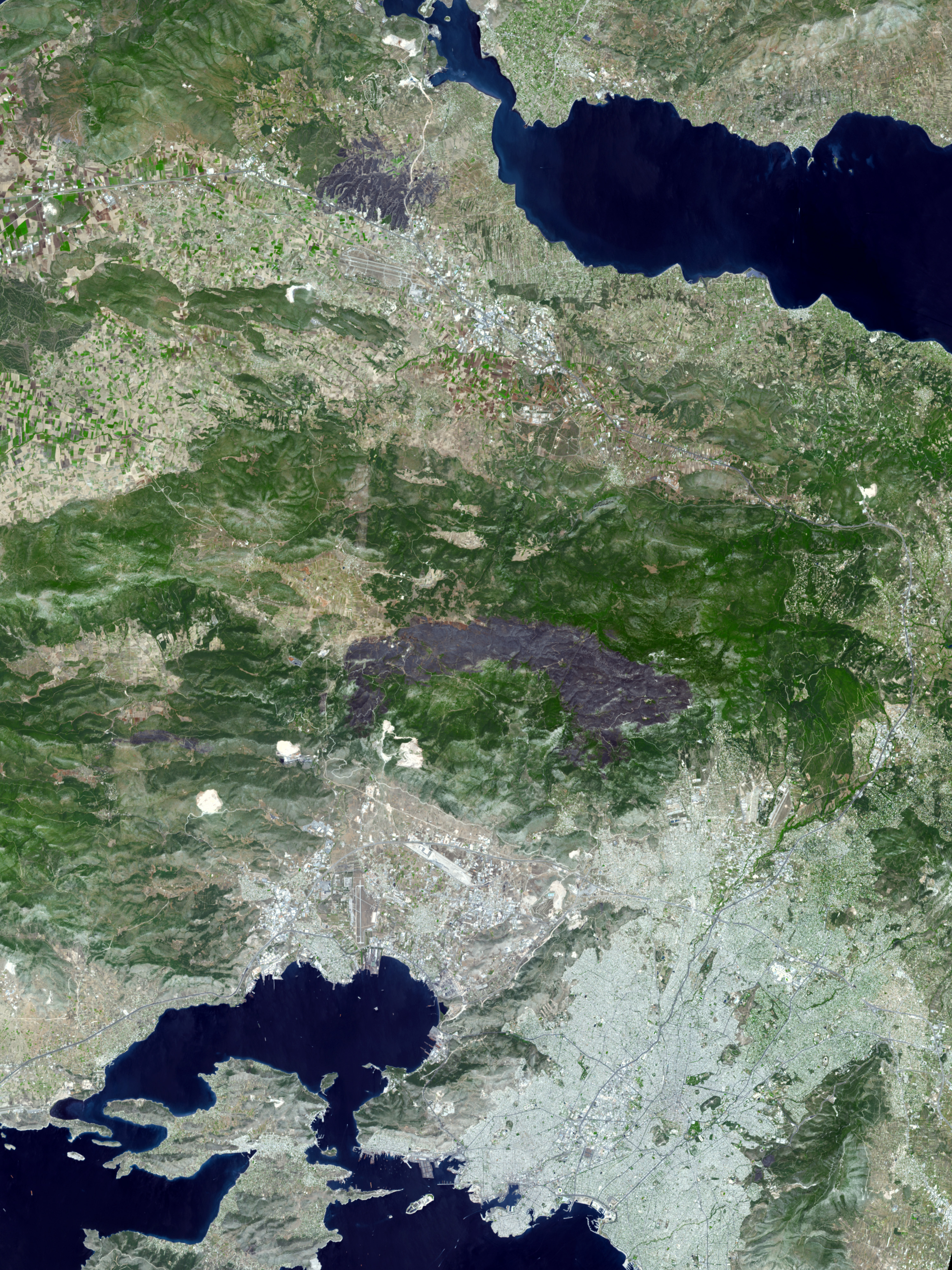
View of Parnitha a month after the major fires.

On 25 August, Super League Greece and the Hellenic Football Federation decided to postpone the opening fixtures scheduled for that weekend due to the fires. Campaigning for the country's forthcoming general election was suspended for a short period of time. The vote was not postponed since this is not allowed under the current Constitution.

The destruction that was caused by the fires is expected to have a large financial impact to the areas affected by the fires. Originally the estimated amount was about 1.5 billion euros in immediate damages. That amount has now risen to 2 billion euros ($2.9 billion). The cumulative financial impact after taking into consideration the loss of national income due to the destruction of the local agricultural infrastructure and the potentially negative impact on local tourism is estimated around 5 billion euros or more.

The status of Olympia for the 2008 Summer Olympics flame-lighting ceremony is threatening to undermine the whole ceremony. The Hellenic Olympic Committee (HOC) has warned that the delays in the reforestation process will undermine the whole ceremony. The HOC states, "Unless it drastically improves in the coming period, (Olympia's) present image will constitute global defamation for Greece."

=== Financial assistance ===
Due to the unprecedented scale of the destruction many of the country's leading banks, businesses, institutions and local administrations have offered considerable amounts of cash in order to help the people and businesses that suffered financially due to the fires. The government has created a special account in all Greek banks, where financial help in relief of the people affected by the fire from all over the world is accepted. Additionally, financial aid from the EU is expected. Forms of assistance in nature were also offered such as olive plants contributed by a Turkish municipality and businessmen to a collect already organized in Mytilene. The Greek Government plans to spend 645.7 million euros ($946.7 million) to restore and rehabilitate areas burnt by the fires. This amount will be provided by both the European Union and the Greek Government. The government has earmarked 150 million euros ($222 million) to help the people affected by the fire rebuild their homes and other buildings. The rapid nature of the response given in the form of a direct aid scheme free of red tape led to official claims in reverse a year after the calamity, as it has been the case for the residents of Ileia who were notified to return the aid payments. Opposition parties, in the meantime, accused the government of using the scheme to "buy" the votes of locals in the weeks before the Greek legislative election, 2007.

The Cypriot Government along with J&P ABAX have pledged to rebuild the town of Artemida. They have currently signed an 8.5 million euro contract, which includes the construction of 80 structures of which 48 will be residential. The overall cost of the project is expected to be 14.5 million euro.

On 20 February 2008 UEFA president Michel Platini presented the Hellenic Football Federation with a CHF1m cheque to help finance the rebuilding of football facilities damaged by the fires in Greece the previous summer.

The European Union has proposed 89.7 million euros in aid to Greece to offset part of the cost of the 2007 forest fires. The grant will be used to reimburse the costs of rescue services, provision of temporary housing, cleaning up of disaster-stricken areas, and the restoration of basic infrastructures to working condition. Furthermore, the EU created a 600-member team of European firefighters to combat continental forest fires, as a response to the 2007 summer forest fires in Southern Europe.

=== Reforestation ===
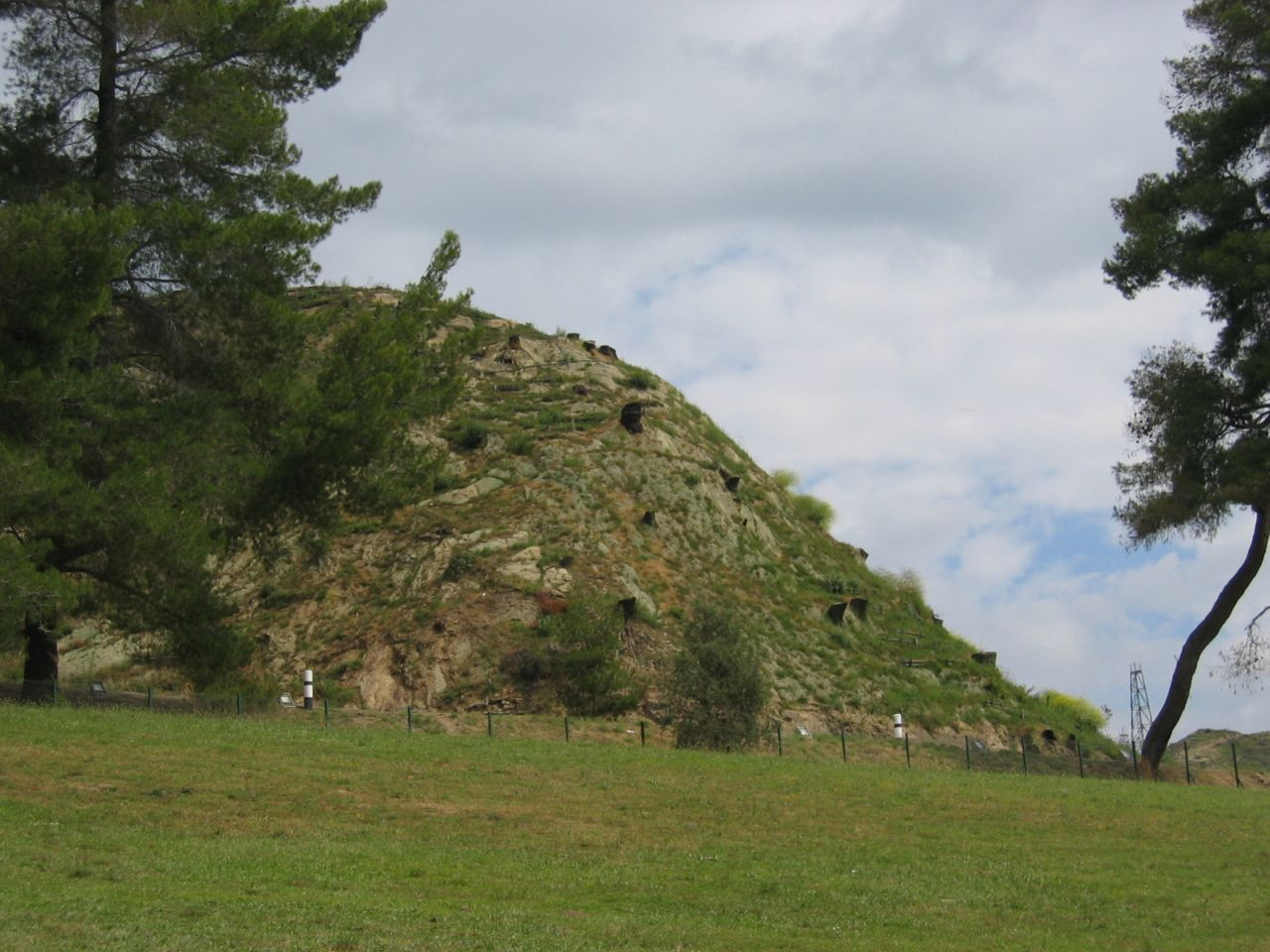
The Hill of Kronos in May 2008.

The Greek Government has urged regional authorities to start replanting large areas burnt by the summer forest fires. The government under Kostas Karamanlis has pledged that all burnt forests will be restored and protected from legal development. Full Replanting is expected to start after a reforestation study by forestry experts that is to be completed by December. Plans included anti-erosion measures and extensive replanting in the hardest hit prefectures of Arcadia, Achaea, Elis, Corinthia, Laconia, Messenia, and Euboea. The Hill of Kronos which was totally burnt by the fires will be replanted with bushes and saplings. These bushes and saplings will include laurel bushes, oaks, olive trees, and other indigenous species.

== See also ==
- List of wildfires
- 2009 Greek forest fires
- 2018 Greek forest fires
- 2021 Greek forest fires
- 2021 Turkish forest fires
- 2007 Croatian coast fires
- 2007 European heat wave
- October 2007 California wildfires
