= 2009 Greek forest fires =

Series of wildfires in Greece

Coordinates: 38.203°N 23.965°E

2009 Attica forest fires
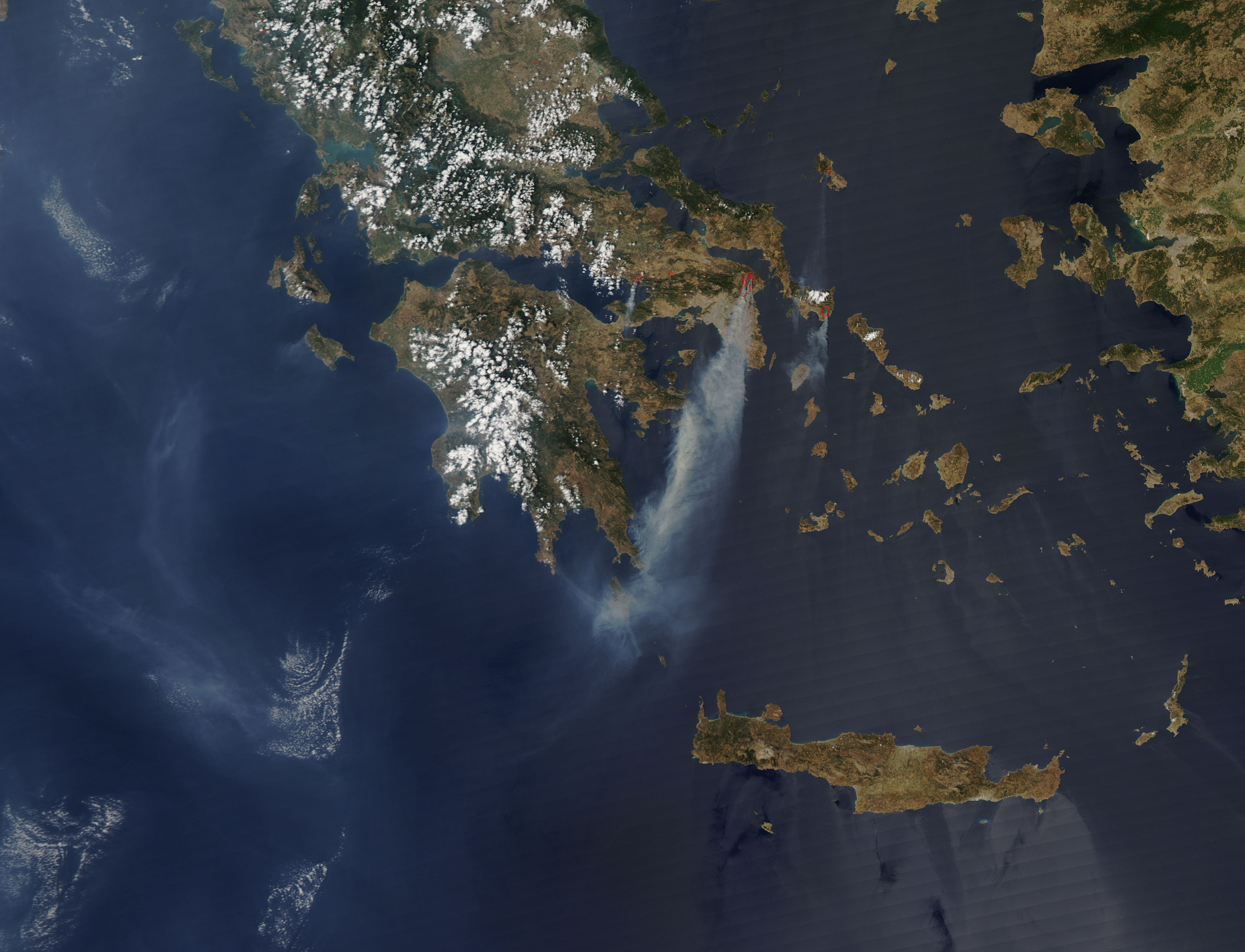
- Satellite image showing the locations of some of the 2009 fires in Greece
- Date: 21 August 2009 – 25 August 2009
- Location: Attica

Statistics
- Burned area: 200,000 stremma

Impacts
- Deaths: None
- Injuries: Unknown

Ignition
- Cause: heat wave, and wind, probable arson

The 2009 Greek forest fires were a series of massive wildfires that broke out across several areas in Greece during the summer of 2009. The fires began in Grammatiko, about 25 mi (40 km) north-east of the Greek capital, Athens on 21 August 2009 and spread quickly towards the suburbs, engulfing fourteen towns within the next three days. 10,000 residents of Agios Stefanos were asked to evacuate the area. Approximately 600 firefighters and soldiers, twelve fire-fighting aircraft and nine helicopters were deployed to extinguish the fire. These fires are the worst since 2007, though no casualties have been reported.

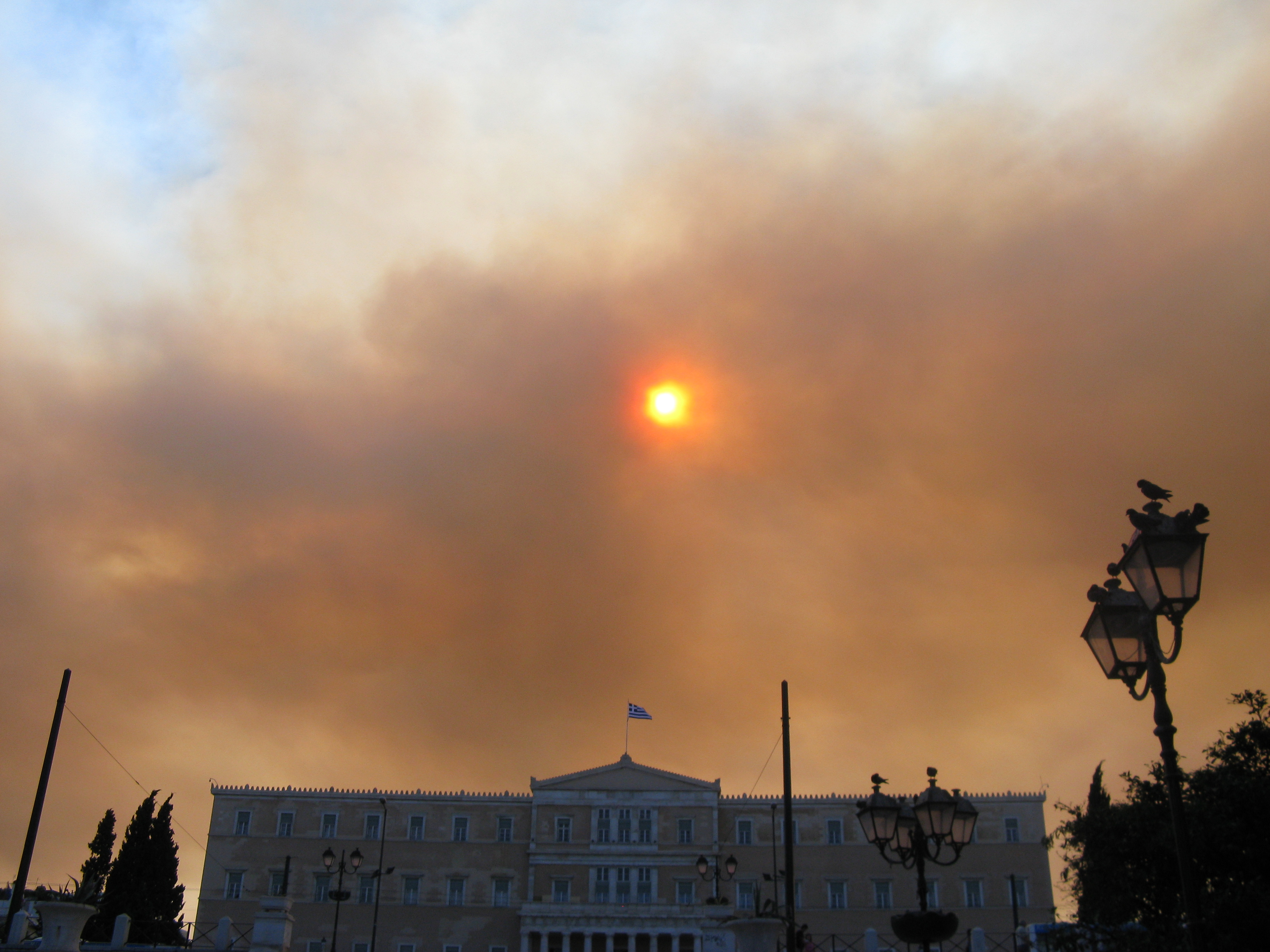
Smoke Above Syntagma Square, Athens, Greece, 22 August 2009

== Background and result of destruction from the fire ==
The fires of 2009 began on the night of August 21, 2009 and burned over the next four days, covering approximately 21,000 hectares of pine forest, olive groves, shrub land and farmland. The fires affected 15 municipalities and communities and destroyed 60 homes, damaging another 150. The fires began in Grammatiko village, about 40 km north-east of Athens, and spread to the mountains of eastern Attica. Around 72 houses were damaged in Grammatiko and other badly hit communities were Stamata and Rodopoli.

More than 1,000 fire-fighters and soldiers were placed on duty over the weekend, and a total of 19 planes and helicopters worked to fight the fires, dropping around 14,000 t (14,000,000 kg) of water on one day alone (24 August 2009). Aircraft were drafted-in from Italy, France and Cyprus. The cost of hiring the fire services 14 helicopters for about 120 flying hours is estimated at 30 million euros.

According to World Wildlife Fund (WWF), Greece, The destruction from three days of intense forest fires “confirms the inability of the state to effectively manage the country’s forests”. Unlike the 2007 Greek forest fires, the 2009 fires took place in eastern Attica, which is a forested-suburban region known for its illegal ribbon development, where thousands of illegal homes have been legalised ahead of successive elections by incumbent governments. This area is also expected to undergo further development and population increase as a result of new urban plans for the area.

Gavril Xanthopoulos, a scientist at the Greek Forest Research Institute in Athens, and one of the country’s leading forest fire experts is quoted as saying: “These areas are what we call a wildland–urban interface, which are not just peculiar to Greece, but exist in all European Mediterranean countries”. The mix of homes and forest can drain fire resources, because the fight is targeted at burning homes and property, allowing forest fires to spread faster. Xanthopoulos claims to have alerted civil protection authorities a fortnight before the fires warning that the drought in vegetation had reached the levels of 2007, that there was an extreme likelihood of fires occurring and that this was reflected in the area’s fire danger map. The meltemi winds, typical of this time of year made the fires head south, which was a predictable trajectory for the fire.

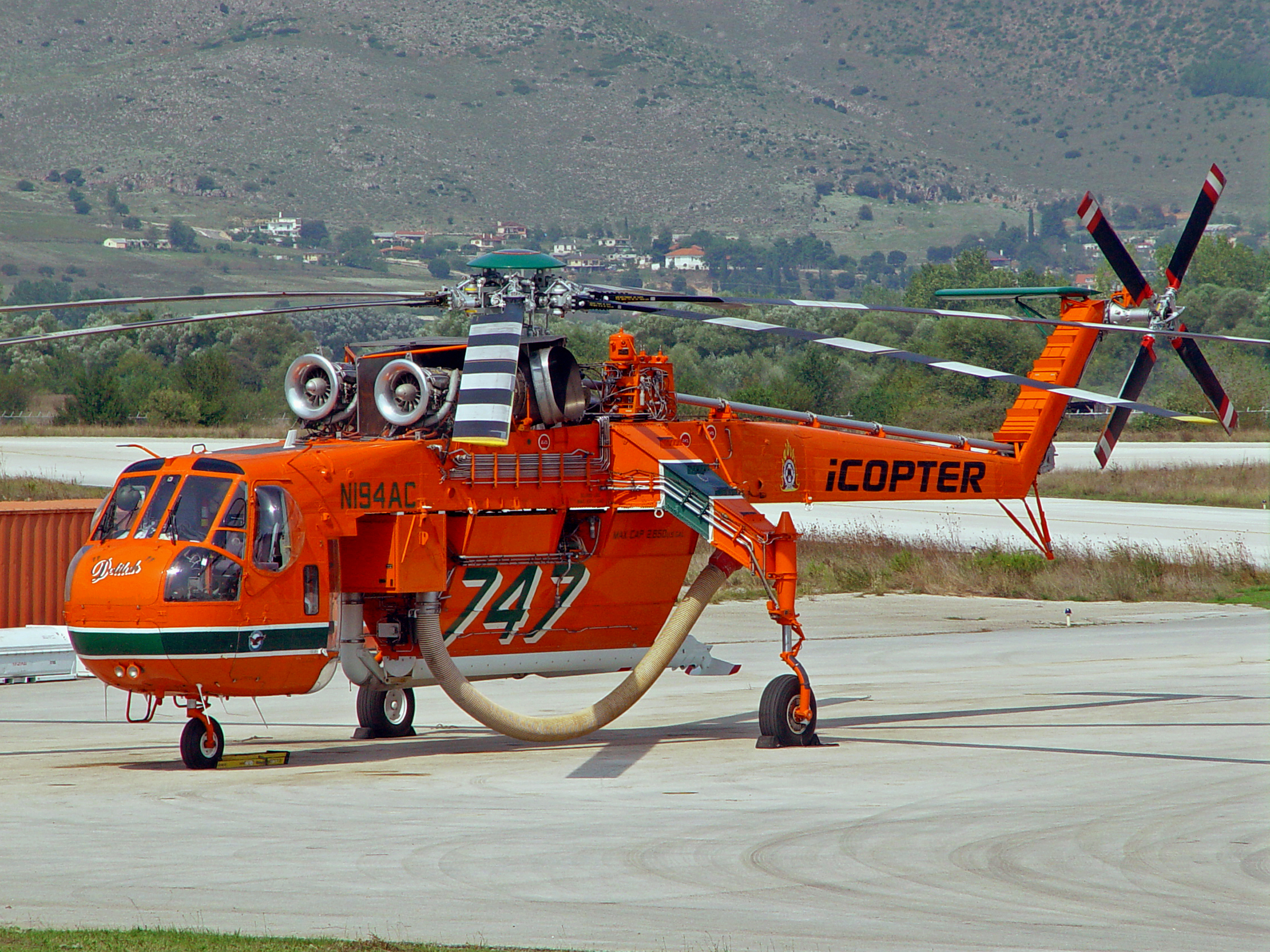
S-64E Erickson Air-Crane helicopter at Ioannina airport, Greece

WWF has called for radical reform of the fire service, which has been weakened, since 1981, by political interference in recruitment and promotion, bureaucratisation, the removal of fire-fighting responsibilities from the forestry service and abolition of the dasokommando, which is a Greek specialised fire-fighting unit. According to Konstantinos Liarikos, environmental programme director of WWF, part of the existing fire service needs to be especially dedicated to forest fire-fighting, and emphasis should be on suppression rather than prevention: the cost of hiring an Erickson Air-Crane Helitanker fire-fighting helicopter is 800,000 euros a season, and is equivalent to the cost of hiring 800 seasonal fire-fighters, which WWF claims would be more effective. In addition, citizen awareness programmes are needed to educated suburban residents about fire prevention and fire-fighting. For example, the connection of electric pumps to swimming pools to help residents to use water for dousing fires. Planting fire-resistant tree species in gardens, such as bay laurel, poplar, acacia and oak, can also help save homes. In 2007, fires spread more slowly in rural areas of the Peloponnese where a farming population kept areas well-managed and clear of grass.

== Factors contributing to the fires ==
- Forestry registry: Although an official forestry registry has been prepared, there is no political agreement on the contours of the state forests. Implementation has also been delayed until the Greek environment ministry has passed its spatial plan for Athens. Without a registry, municipalities are unable to identify land use changes and illegal house-building.
- 1997: The dasokommandos are disbanded.
- 1998: The forestry service loses control of forest fire-fighting, which is assumed by the fire service. This separates forest management from forest fire-fighting.
- 2003: Legislation, known as Law 3208/2003, changes the definition of what constitutes a forest and suspends penalties for construction within forests and their arbitrary destruction: fires rarely seem to occur on land with no real estate value.
- Fire prevention: The government spends approximately ten times more on fire suppression than fire prevention. Money goes to local authorities and is not accounted for.
- Resources: Greece has the same number of fire-fighting planes in 2009 as it did in 2007, with only around 10 Canadair water-bombing planes.
- Depleted fire and forestry services: 3,000 permanent vacancies remain to be filled in the fire service, leaving the service under-staffed. The forestry service remains “decimated by staff shortages” (WWF) and needs 30% more forestry scientists, 70% more forestry technicians, and 55% more forestry rangers.
- Civil protection system: This is almost non-existent, and voluntary forces are not used effectively.
- Co-ordination: Co-operation between branches of the fire, forestry and civil protection services remain fragmented and there is no umbrella framework for strategic co-operation and planning.
- Priority: Fire protection does not appear to be a national priority for the government, which has focused attention on economic issues, such as the budget deficit.

== Effect on wildlife ==
About half the burnt woodlands should be able to recover because they are mature pine forests. The other half, are low in regenerative capacity due to repeated burning. Countless animals have perished in the fires, tortoises being the most easily visible, due to their burnt-out shells. Birds and faster-moving animals can flee, but will now over-burden nearby eco-systems. Surviving animals may suffer from burns and smoke inhalation. Re-colonisation of burnt areas will be slow, commencing with insects, lizards and birds, with hares, partridges and foxes only arriving after the first rain has led to new growth. Lack of forest cover will make it easier for predators to locate certain prey species. The Association for the Protection and Welfare of Wildlife (Anima) operate a 24-hour call centre for animal casualties.

== Effect on cultural heritage ==
The antiquities linked to the battle of Marathon were not directly damaged, although the physical setting of the sites has been destroyed. The sites include the Marathon battle site, Tomb of the Marathon Warriors, the Marathon Museum, Tomb of the Plataeans, and Ramnous. The sites were saved, due to the fight of local residents during the night of 23–24 August, and the assistance of a northerly wind that helped contain the fires and avoid catastrophe to the ancient monuments and ecologically important area of Schinias. Marathon residents had already been fighting the construction of a land-fill site outside Grammatiko.

== Attica fires chronology ==
- 1981: Kifisia, 612 hectares
- 1982: Dionysos, 1,360 hectares
- 1986: Varibombi, 500 hectares
- 1992: Avlona, 6,700 hectares
- 1993: Pendeli, 5,700 hectares
- 2005: Raphina, 1,100 hectares
- 2007: Parnitha, 5,000 hectares

== Aftermath ==
Since the fires some areas, for example, around Lake Marathon, have been reported as being subject to grazing by flocks of goats. The goats are wandering freely over the burnt-out forest areas. Grazing goats is forbidden in Attica under a law of 1993. After the fires of August 2009, the grazing of other types of animals in forest areas, such as sheep and cattle, was also forbidden.

The burnt areas of forest appear to be unmonitored by forest patrols. There are only 49 forest guards in Attica, which means that each guard must patrol an area of 83,000 stremmata. A modern stremma is approximately 1,000 square metres and thus .1 hectares or .247 acres. The total forested extent of Attica is 3,500,000 stremmata. In some areas, olive trees have been planted within the burnt forest areas. This is one of the first illegal steps in transforming unmonitored forested areas into cultivated land.

Mr Nikos Chlikas, a forester and environmentalist, has emphasised that about 90,000 to 100,000 stremmata in north-east Attica have been burnt for a second or third time, out of the total of 210,000 stremmata, which was burnt in August 2009. In these areas, it is essential that there is intervention by the authorities to help forest regeneration because the pine trees are very young and do not have the capacity to create cones. This forest cannot regenerate by itself. In addition, the number of small trees which are, at the moment, in the nursery at Amigdales will have difficulty covering 3,000-4,000 stremmata, for this reason money needs to be allocated for new trees, so that planting can take place over the next few years. According to Nikos Chlikas, the cost of reforestation is around 500 euro for each stremma, including the cost of caring for the trees for at least two years. However, in 2008 less than 10,000 stremmata were reforested in the whole of Greece.

As part of the post-fire protection work, the Geotechnical Chamber of Greece (Το Γεωτεχνικό Επιμελητήριο Ελλάδας (ΓΕΩΤ.Ε.Ε.)) with the aim of taking measures to protect the area have placed logs and matted branches along the ground in burnt forest areas, in order to slow down runoff and so reduce erosion. In some areas, cement dams have been constructed at some points, although experts question the logic of this, and claim that it is an excessive intervention into the environment. In the secondary and tertiary burnt areas there are, however, insufficient logs of the right size for creating barriers to run-off erosion. Mr Antonis Angelopoulos, a geologist and vice-president of the Geotechnical Chamber of Greece, Eastern Mainland Greece section, agrees that some of the interventions into the environment have been excessive. For example, in Agia Varvara, the permanent cement structures that have been made were probably unnecessary, because the area has already got at least two old, stone dams, which could have been recycled. However, on the gulley of Agiou Stefanou, the anti-runoff work has been positive, because dams have been constructed from boxes made out of wire. This is friendlier to the environment, because these dams hold back rain-washed matter, but allow water to pass through.

== Proposed legislation ==
The new Minister for the Environment, Energy and Climate Change, Tina Birbili, has created a new draft bill which was announced on 27 October 2009. This legislation would suspend all construction activity on burned forestland in Attica and other parts of Greece until authorities draw up comprehensive forest maps. The ban will be imposed on the issuing of construction licences except for the repair of homes and public buildings destroyed in the fires.

The Hellenic Mapping and Cadastral Organization (HEMCO), established in 1986, will soon start operating a sophisticated system of forest land on the outskirts of Attica, with the aim of reporting back to the authorities the appearance of every new structure outside the town plan.

The bill is to be submitted to the Greek Parliament in the first week of November 2009 and provides for the creation of a special state agency which will demolish illegally built homes on burned forest land and fine offenders. The ministry’s environmental inspectors would have the responsibility of locating and demolishing illegal constructions. The 2003 reform introduced by the former Agriculture Minister Giorgos Drys, under the Panhellenic Socialist Movement's previous administration, which required at least one-quarter of a piece of land must be covered by forest for it to qualify as forest land. The new bill will reinstate the original 15% requirement.

== See also ==
- 2007 Greek forest fires
- 2009 Mediterranean wildfires
- 2018 Attica wildfires
