= 1626 Lingqiu earthquake =

1626 earthquake in China

- Location within China
- Local date: June 28, 1626
- Magnitude: M_{s} 7.0
- Epicenter: 39.4°N 114.2°E
- Areas affected: Qing dynasty
- Max. intensity: CSIS IX
- Casualties: >5,200 dead

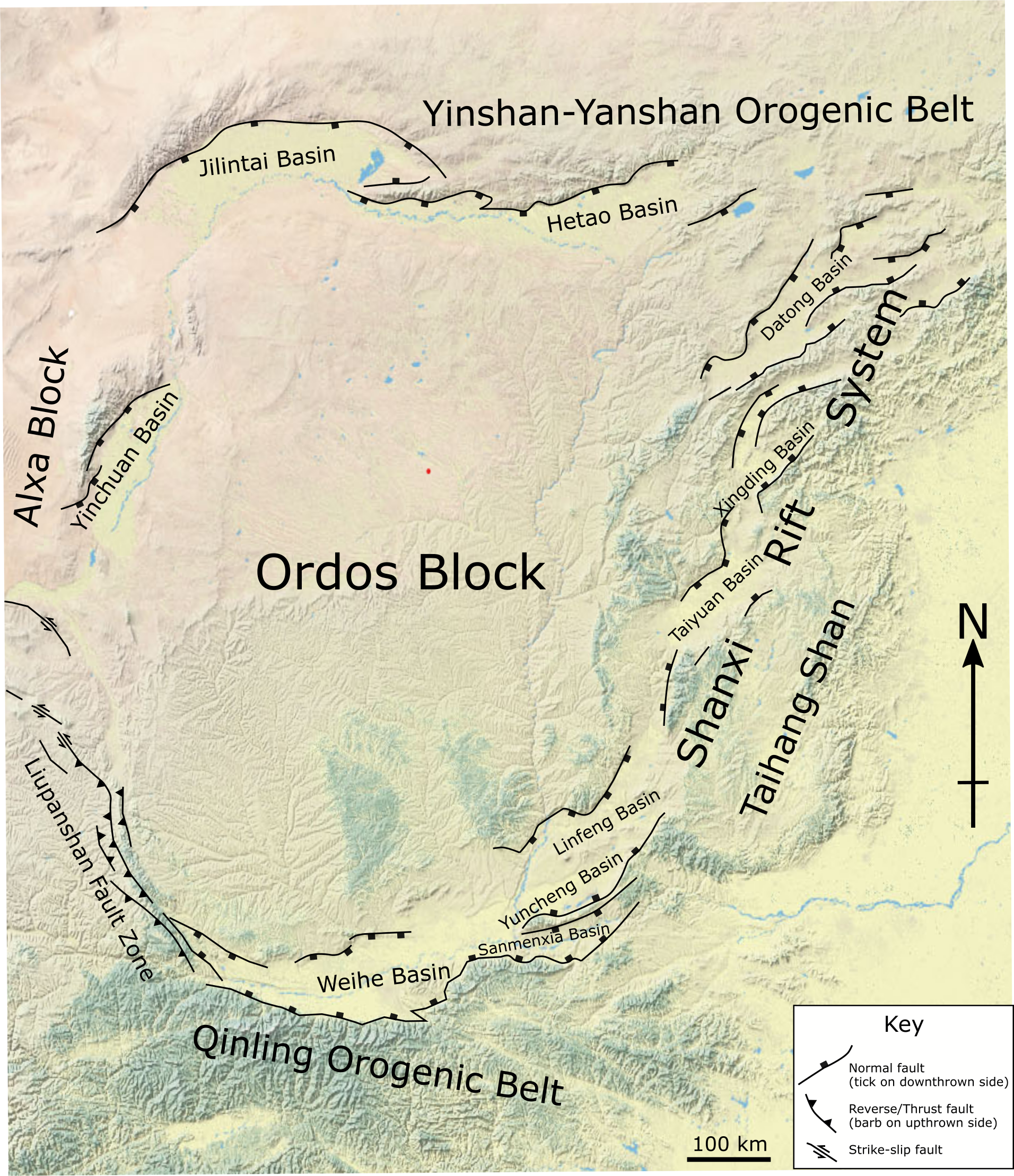
Map of the Shanxi Rift System along the eastern margin of the Ordos Block

The 1626 Lingqiu earthquake had an epicentre in Lingqiu County, Shanxi Province during the Ming dynasty. The estimated surface wave magnitude (M_{s}) 7.0 earthquake caused many buildings to collapse. Over 5,200 people were killed.

== Tectonic setting ==
The Shanxi Rift System is a seismically active intra-continental rift zone in North China. Since 231 BC, eight M_{s} 7.0 earthquakes have occurred along the rift system. The 1303 Hongdong, 1556 Shanxi, and 1695 Linfen earthquakes were the deadliest associated with the rift, with death tolls of 50,000 to 830,000 respectively.

Bounded to the west by the Lüliang Mountains, and the east by the Taihang Mountains, the Shanxi Rift forms the eastern boundary of the Ordos Block; a fragment of continental crust within the Eurasian plate. Within the rift features half-grabens. It formed when extension began in the Miocene or Pliocene, separating the crust into the Ordos Block from the North China Craton. The reason for extension in this part of China is still debated although the most agreed hypothesis is crustal deformation resulting from the India-Asia collision involving the Indian and Eurasian plates along the Main Himalayan Thrust in the Himalayas, causing the rotation of crustal blocks in China. Other hypotheses are slab rollback of the Pacific plate as it subducts along the east coast of Japan, or localised intraplate tectonics.

Dip-slip and strike-slip earthquakes in North China are consistent with ongoing crustal extension along the Shanxi Rift System. The rift extends for 1,200 km, and is up to 60 km wide. The graben is bounded by normal faults on both sides capable of generating earthquakes. Extension along the rift zone occur at a slow rate of 0.8 ± 0.3 mm/year, therefore earthquakes occur with long intervals of recurrence. The estimated magnitudes of earthquakes by Chinese researchers previously have possible inaccuracies as they are based on written descriptions and death toll from the earthquakes.

== Earthquake ==
The earthquake rupture involved two conjugated faults; the Shuijian–Luoshuihe Fault, and the Huashanhe Fault. The Shuijian–Luoshuihe Fault is located west of Lingqiu County, where is strikes in a north-northeast direction. A one-meter-high fault scarp is visible on the surface, corresponding to the 1626 earthquake. Both faults have shallow dipping angles in the east and west direction, and have a normal slip sense. It has an estimated magnitude of M_{s} 7.0 and China seismic intensity scale rating of IX (Destructive).

In another study, the earthquake is proposed to have occurred in the Fenwei Graben System along a strike-slip fault. The rupture is estimated at 134.13 km by 26 km, with an epicentre located at 39.4°N 114.2°E, and a hypocentre depth of 7.5 km beneath the surface.

== Damage ==
At Lingqiu, many homes belonging to officials and civillains were destroyed. Liquefaction events occurred; black water erupted from dry wells. More than 5,200 people died in the county. About 80–90% of government offices, homes, and warehouses collapsed in Hunyuan County. Much of the city walls fell. Additional buildings and structures were left in ruins at Yuxian, and Laiyuan. It was felt in the provinces of Shandong, Hebei, and Henan. The shaking was also felt in Beijing.

== See also ==
- List of earthquakes in China
- List of historical earthquakes
