= 1815 Pinglu earthquake =

Earthquake in Shanxi, China

- Location within Shanxi Location within China
- Local date: October 23, 1815
- Magnitude: M_{s} 6.8,
- Epicenter: 34.8°N 111.2°E
- Fault: Sanmenxia-Lingbao Fault
- Type: Normal
- Areas affected: Henan, Shanxi, Qing Dynasty
- Max. intensity: MMI IX (Violent)
- Casualties: >13,000 dead

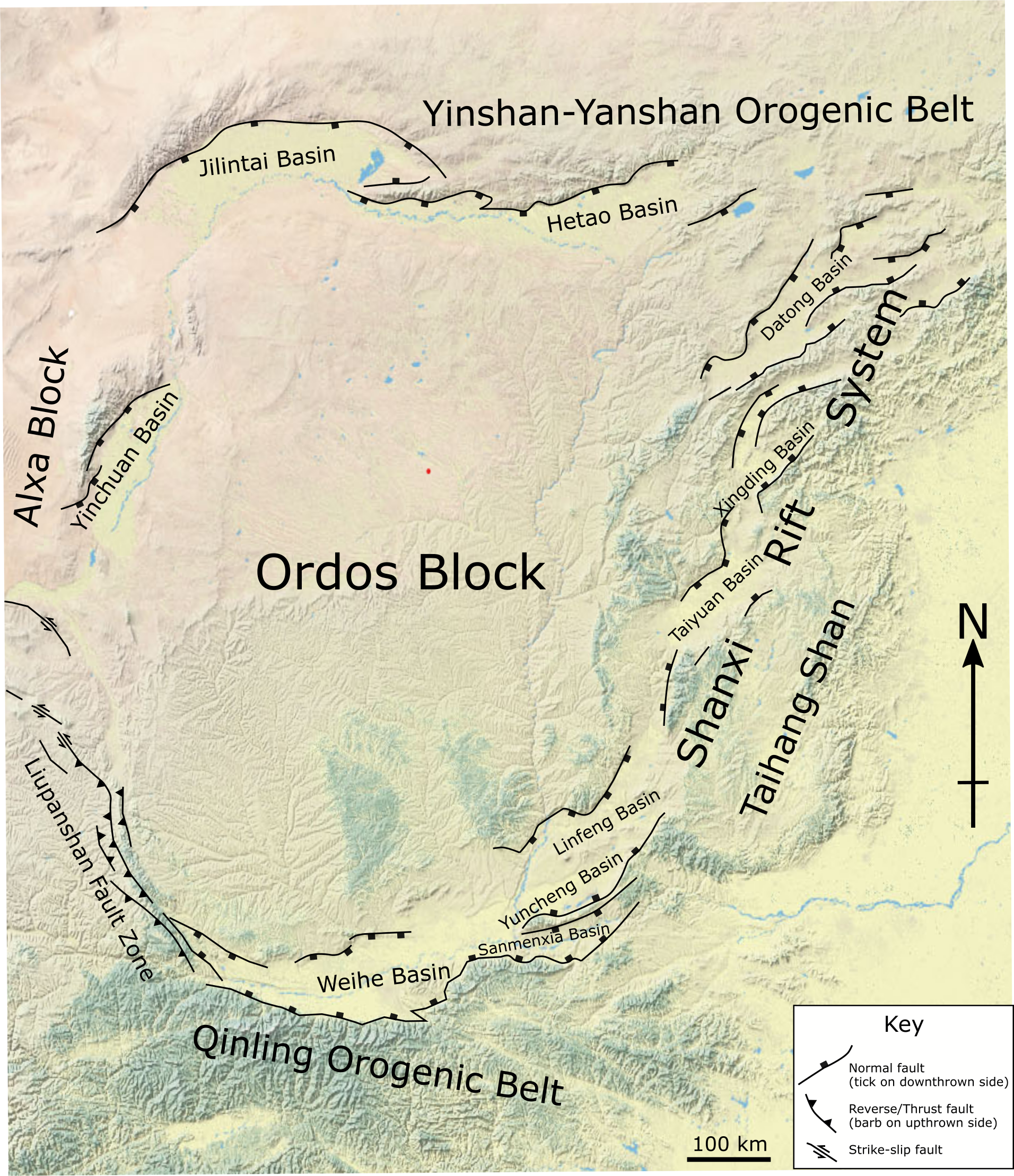
Map of the Shanxi Rift System along the eastern margin of the Ordos Block

Western Henan and southern Shanxi in northern China were struck by an earthquake of estimated magnitude M_{s}6.8 on 23 October 1815. The epicentre was in Pinglu County in southernmost Shanxi, which was the worst affected area. It had a maximum felt intensity of IX (violent) on the Modified Mercalli scale. It caused the collapse of many houses and cave dwellings and led to the deaths of at least 13,000 people.

== Tectonic setting ==
Shanxi and nearby provinces lie across the Shanxi Rift System, an active intraplate zone of rifting. The rift system forms the southern and eastern borders of the Ordos Block. This zone of extensional tectonics is a reaction to the ongoing collision of the Indian plate with the Eurasian plate. This has caused rotation of the Ordos and North China blocks leading to extensional displacement between them. At its southwestern end in Shaanxi the rift system has a west–east trend, before turning to a SSW–NNE trend through most of Shanxi. The individual rift basins and their bounding faults that make up the overall system mostly have a WSW–ENE to SW–NE trend. Ruptures along these rift faults have been the cause of many damaging earthquakes, including the 1303 Hongdong (>200,000 casualties) and 1556 Shaanxi (~830,000 casualties) earthquakes.

== Earthquake ==
The estimated magnitude for this earthquake is about 6.8 M_{s}. The earthquake is thought to have ruptured the Sanmenxia-Lingbao Fault, with a normal fault mechanism. An analysis of the evolution of stresses following the 1303 earthquake at Hongdong, suggest that most of the earthquakes in the rift system can be explained by progressive coulomb stress transfer, although the main earthquake to affect the 1815 rupture is judged to be the 1556 Shaanxi event, rather than any other earthquakes that affected the system in the intervening period.

== Damage ==
Pinglu suffered the most severe damage, with the collapse of between 30% and 40% of houses and cave dwellings. Other structures were equally affected, including office buildings, prisons, storehouses and the city walls. 8,677 deaths were recorded in Maojin alone. In Ruicheng town, damage was limited, but the surrounding villages were badly affected and about 1,600 people were killed. The tops of the city walls collapsed in Shanxian, as did many other buildings, with 1,340 deaths reported. Severe damage was also reported from Xiezhou (844 deaths), Yuxiang (683 deaths), Lingbao (>390 deaths), Anyi (>290 deaths) and Yuncheng (>100 deaths).
