= Zhongwei-Tongxin fault =

Coordinates: 37.236°N 105.714°E

The Zhongwei-Tongxin fault or Tianjingshan fault is an arcuate sinistral (left-lateral) strike-slip zone, forming one of the major structures on the northeastern margin of Tibetan Plateau. Six paleoearthquake events in the past 14,000 years have been recorded along the Zhongwei-Tongxin fault zone. Among the earthquakes recorded are the 1622 North Guyuan earthquake, which had a magnitude of 7.0 and mid-seismogenic depth of about 15 kilometres (9.3 mi), the 1709 Zhongwei earthquake, which had a magnitude of 7.5.

== Tectonic setting ==
The Zhongwei-Tongxin fault is one of the structures that accommodates the eastward spreading of the thickened crust of the Tibetan Plateau, the result of the ongoing collision between the Indian plate and the Eurasian plate. The northeastern margin of the Tibetan Plateau is marked by a combination of sinistral (left-lateral) strike-slip faults and thrust faults. The largest of the strike-slip faults is the 1,000 km long WNW–ESE trending Haiyan fault, which links to the east with the northern end of the Liupanshan Fault zone, a fold and thrust belt that accommodates the eastward motion of the plateau against the Ordos Block. To the north of the western part of the Haiyuan Fault, the northern boundary of the Qilian Shan is formed by WNW–ESE trending thrust faults of the Hexi Corridor. Near Gulang, the Haiyuan Fault splays onto the west–east trending Gulang Fault, which continues to the east as the four segments of the Zhongwei-Tongxin fault.

== Geometry ==
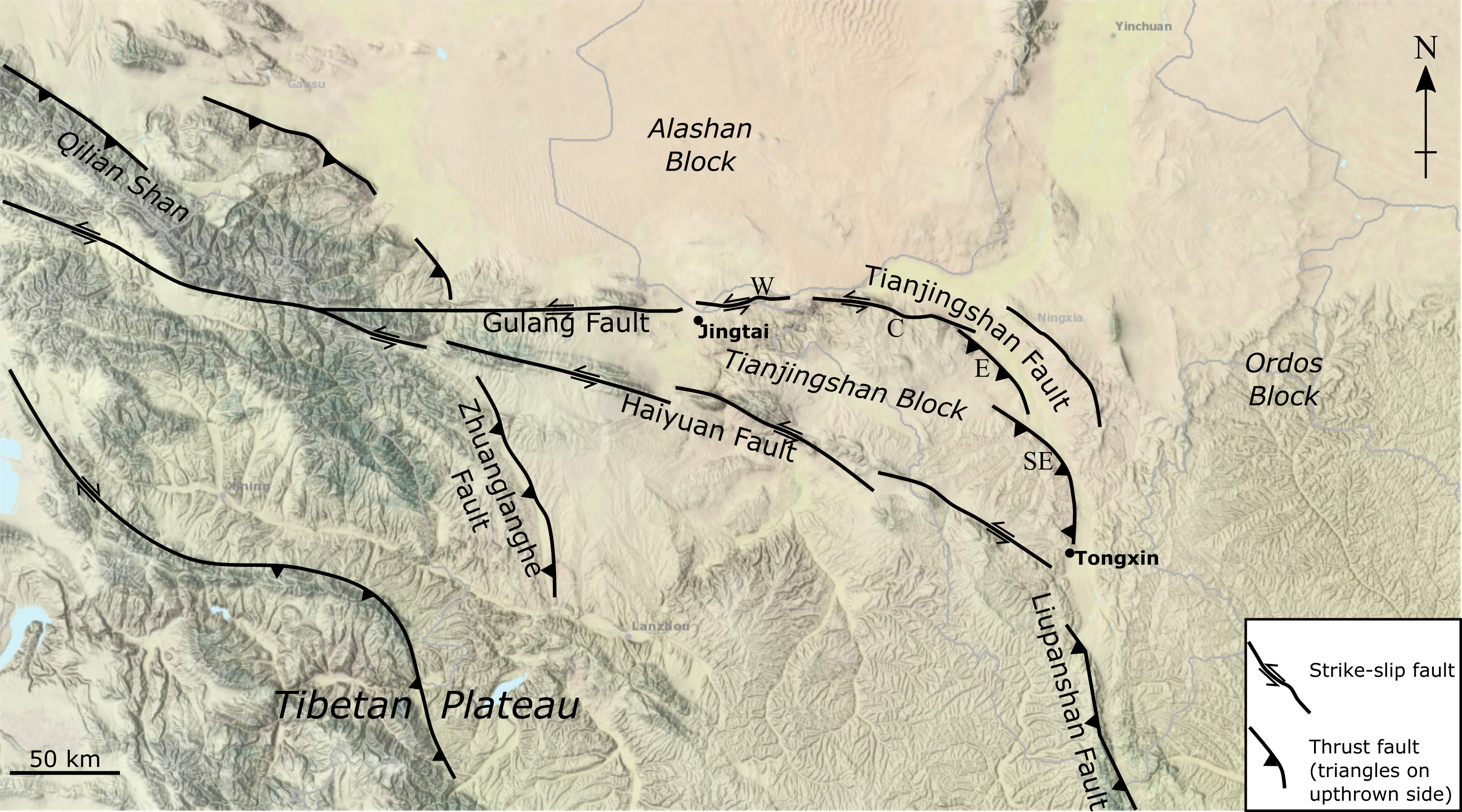
Map of TianJingshan Fault and related structures

The fault zone extends for about 240 km from just north of Jingtai in the west to near Tongxin in the east. Four main segments have been recognised, the western, central, eastern and southeastern. The western and central segments have mainly sinistral strike-slip motion, accommodating movement between the Tiangjingshan Block (TJSB) and the Alashan Block to the north. The eastern and southeastern segments are mainly thrust faults in type, accommodating shortening between the TJSB and the Ordos Block to the east.

== Slip rates ==
Slip rates along the Zhongwei-Tongxin fault have been estimated from the offset of landforms, the analysis of past earthquakes by trenching and GPS data. The landforms, such as stream valleys, alluvial fans and river terraces, have been dated using optically stimulated luminescence (OSL), as radiocarbon dating cannot be used because of the extremely dry conditions. These three approaches give consistent results of 1.1±0.2 mm per year of sinistral strike-slip for the fault zone over a range of timescales from decades for the GPS data, up to a million years from offset markers.

== Seismicity ==
Paleoseismic investigations of the Zhongwei-Tongxin fault zone have revealed evidence of three major earthquakes. The most recent of these has been identified as the 1709 Zhongwei earthquake, with the earlier events being dated to 5,450±238 years Before Present (BP) and 8,850±350 years BP.
