= 1709 Zhongwei earthquake =

Earthquake in China

- Location within Ningxia Location within China
- Local date: October 14, 1709
- Local time: morning
- Magnitude: 7.5 M_{s}
- Epicenter: 37.4°N 105.3°E
- Fault: Tianjingshan Fault
- Type: Strike-slip
- Areas affected: Zhongwei, Viceroy of Shan-Shaan, Qing Dynasty
- Max. intensity: MMI X (Extreme)
- Casualties: 2,032 dead

The region of Ningxia (then part of Shaanxi, ruled by the Viceroy of Shan-Shaan) was struck by a major earthquake on the morning of 14 October 1709. It had an estimated magnitude of 7.5 M_{s} and a maximum felt intensity of X (extreme) on the Modified Mercalli intensity scale. The city of Zhongwei was badly damaged, including a section of the Great Wall. A total of 2,032 people were killed.

== Tectonic setting ==
Zhongwei lies close to the northern edge of the Tibetan Plateau. The plateau is a large region of thickened crust created by the ongoing collision between the Indian Plate and the Eurasian Plate. The thickened crust is spreading laterally towards the east, accommodate by a series of mainly sinistral (left lateral) strike-slip faults, such as the Kunlun Fault and Haiyuan Fault. A major splay of the Haiyuan Fault is the Tianjingshan Fault, which is also a sinistral strike-slip fault in its western part, where it runs close to Zhongwei, passing into a mainly thrust fault section to the east, where it accommodates shortening between the Tibetan Plateau and the Ordos Block.

== Earthquake ==
The earthquake is known to have ruptured the central segment of the Tianjingshan Fault and part of the eastern segment. There is a clear surface rupture of 53 km and trenching across the fault zone has confirmed that this resulted from the 1709 earthquake. An average sinistral displacement of 4.8 ±0.8 m has been estimated for this event, with a maximum offset of about 7.4 m.

Aftershocks affected the area several times a day for the first 50 days, dying out completely about a year later.

== Damage ==
In Zhongwei, the earthquake caused the collapse of many walls, including about three-quarters of the city walls. Many buildings were destroyed, including houses, schools, county offices, government buildings and the Temple of Confucius. Flooding was reported in areas south of the Yellow River. A 5 km section of the Great Wall collapsed at Jingyuan.

== See also ==
- List of historical earthquakes
- List of earthquakes in China
