= Chinese famine of 1906–1907 =

Famine in eastern China

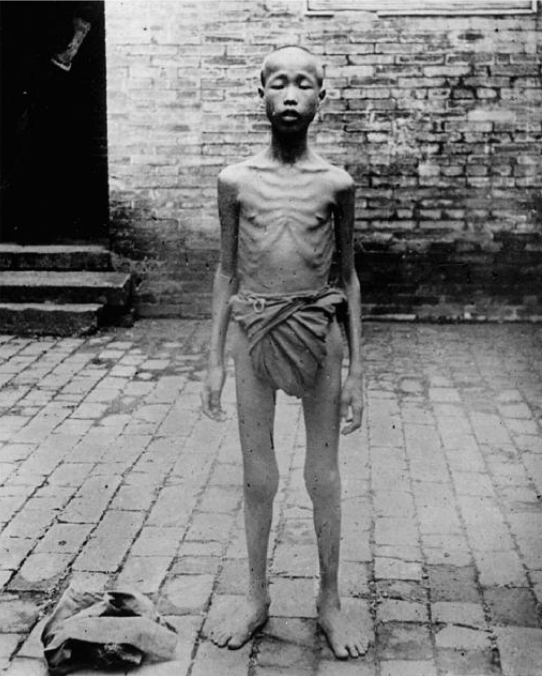
- A beggar on the street in circa 1907.
- Country: (Qing dynasty) China
- Location: Northern Anhui and northern Jiangsu
- Period: 1906–1907
- Total deaths: 20–25 million
- Causes: 1906 China floods, poor harvest
- Relief: Thousands of tons of food donated via private donations
- Consequences: Contributed to the causes of the 1911 Revolution
- Preceded by: Northern Chinese famine of 1901
- Succeeded by: Chinese famine of 1920–1921

The Chinese famine of 1906–1907 struck the middle and lower course of the Huai River in the Qing Dynasty from Autumn 1906 to Spring 1907, administratively in northern Anhui and northern Jiangsu provinces. This Chinese famine was directly caused by the 1906 Huai River floods (April–October 1906), which hit the Huai River particularly hard and destroyed both the summer and autumn harvest. It has been estimated that between 20 and 25 million people died, although this figure is highly uncertain.

== Affected area ==
=== Northern Anhui ===
On 21 December 1906, Shen Bao reported 16 counties in northern Anhui to have particular high mortalities. The edict by Emperor Guangxu on 9 February 1907 waived agricultural taxes to 40 counties in northern Anhui. The 40 counties were:

=== Northern Jiangsu ===
On 29 November 1906, Duanfang, the Viceroy of the Two Yangtze Provinces requested Emperor Guangxu to permit Jiangsu to redirect the imperial taxes to disaster relief. He cited 13 counties to be disaster-stricken.

== Death toll ==
The primary sources only reported fatalities in selected villages or counties. On 21 December 1906, Shen Bao, a leading Shanghai newspaper, reported "a precise death toll has become clear recently in 16 respective counties in Anhui" and amounted to 23,300. The Pilbarra Goldfield News, an Australian newspaper of the time, reported in 20 April 1907 that victims amounted to 5,000 daily.

Anhui and Jiangsu had a combined population of 42.1 million as of 1911. One commentary from the 2010s estimated the total famine deaths to be 25 million, implying that most of the population of northern Anhui and northern Jiangsu population were wiped out; however, they offered no explanation as to how the calculation was made.

== Relief work ==
It was the first time in Qing dynasty history when the government formally acknowledged and collaborated with private organizations in disaster relief work ("官义合办"), which attracted a lot of academic interest. The relief campaign was coordinated by Sheng Xuanhuai and Lü Haihuan, two statesmen of Jiangsu origin. The lack of Anhui elites in Shanghai, however, led to a huge funding disparity to the much more stricken northern Anhui.

Most of the foreign relief fund came from American missionaries. The American Red Cross and the American newspaper Christian Herald furnished over two-thirds of foreign funds sent to China. The Central China Famine Relief Fund Committee was established to coordinate foreign efforts.

On 26 June 1907, The Sydney Morning Herald reported that the crisis was at an end.

== See also ==
- List of famines in China
