= Tianjin soup kitchen fire =

1878 fire in Tianjin, China

On 6 January 1878, a fire at Baosheng Porridge Factory, a soup kitchen in Tianjin, Qing China, caused approximately 2,000 deaths.

The fire, which occurred at a time of turmoil in China, was exacerbated by flammable materials the complex was constructed with. In the aftermath, an unknown number of people died after becoming homeless.

== Background ==
Photograph from a contemporary postcard of a porridge stand in the area of the factory

The Baosheng Porridge Factory was one of the few social relief institutions in Qing China. To avoid social turmoil, every winter the institution would receive funding from local city governments to provide food and shelter for the homeless.

In 1878, China was experiencing the drought-induced Dingwu Famine, which caused widespread starvation in northern China and between nine and thirteen million deaths. Due to the drought, many people fled from the northern provinces to Beijing and Tianjin. To keep up with the influx of homeless people, the number of soup kitchens in Tianjin was increased to twelve, which fed a total of nearly 60,000 drought victims. The Baosheng Porridge Factory specifically catered to women, and at the time of the fire, more than 2,000 were living in the complex.

== Fire and aftermath ==
On the morning of 6 January 1878, a fire broke out near the east gate of Tianjin, and due to strong winds, it quickly spread to the nearby Dabei Monastery, followed by the soup kitchen. As people were finishing eating, the northwest corner filled with smoke and fire and quickly engulfed the entire area. Over 2,000 people perished, and 300–400 were rescued.

The high death toll was attributed to the flammable materials the complex was built with (bamboo and reeds) and the narrow passageways, which made it difficult for more than one person to pass through. It was also discovered that as victims were attempting to flee, the gatekeeper locked the only exit, trapping everyone inside, as it was protocol to not allow people to leave the area freely.

After the fire, a total of 1,019 bodies were collected. Under public pressure, Li Hongzhang requested that the committee members responsible for the Baosheng Porridge Factory be dismissed and never re-employed. Additionally, all other soup kitchens in Tianjin were shut down to avoid future incidents, and drought victims were released back onto the streets, many of whom died of poverty, illness, freezing, or starvation.

== See also ==
- List of fires in China
- List of disasters in China by death toll
