= List of disasters in China by death toll =

This is a list of disasters in China by death toll.

== Earthquake ==
A full list in chronological order is detailed in the list of earthquakes in China. Among which, the most fatal ones were:

Date	Article	Province	Deaths	Notes
25 September 1303	Hongdong earthquake	Shanxi	270,000	
23 January 1556	Huaxian earthquake	Shaanxi	100,000+	
16 December 1920	Haiyuan earthquake	Ningxia	265,000	
27 July 1976	Tangshan earthquake	Hebei	300,000+	

== Famine ==
A full list in chronological order is detailed in the list of famines in China. The most fatal ones were:

Name; area	Deaths	Causes
Great Chinese Famine of 1958–62	15–55 million	Great Leap Forward economic failure. The starved could not move out because all out-of-town traffic was guarded by militia to contain the news of starvation.
Chinese famine of 1906–1907: Anhui, Jiangsu.	20–25 million	Flood
Chinese famine of 1876–79: Shanxi, Shaanxi, Henan.	9–13 million	Drought
Chinese famine of 1928–30: Gansu, Shaanxi.	6 million	Drought

== Fire ==
A full list in chronological order is detailed in the list of fires in China. The most fatal ones were:

Date, location	Article	Deaths	Causes
6 January 1878, Tianjin	Tianjin soup kitchen fire	2,000	The gate of the soup kitchen was always locked to prevent hunger from causing social unrest, which prevented evacuation in case of fire.
18 February 1977, Khorgas, Xinjiang	61st Regiment Farm fire	694	Most deaths were the troops' children. At Chinese New Year, a child set off a firecracker and ignited the wreaths for the funeral of Mao Zedong, which for many months no one dared to dispose of for fear of being accused of disrespecting.
12 August 2015, Tianjin	2015 Tianjin explosions	173	A series of explosions at the Port of Tianjin in Tianjin, northern China, killed 173 people.

== Flood ==
A full list in chronological order is detailed in the list of floods in China. The most fatal ones were:

Article	Province	Deaths	Notes
1887 Yellow River flood	Henan, Anhui, Jiangsu	930,000	
1931 China floods	Jiangsu	422,499–4,000,000	More deaths caused by the flood-led famine.
1975 Banqiao dam failure	Henan, Anhui	230,000	This dam failure was a landmark technological failure in the 20th century.

== See also ==
- List of massacres in China
- List of rail accidents in China
- Aviation accidents and incidents in China
