= Luoyang Christmas fire =

2000 fire in Luoyang, China

- Date: 25 December 2000
- Time: Around 9:00 p.m. (CST (UTC+08:00))
- Venue: Dongdu Commercial Building (东都商厦)
- Location: Zhongzhou Road, Luoyang, China; 34.683931°N 112.473680°E
- Also known as: 洛阳东都商厦"12·25"特大火灾
- Type: Fire
- Deaths: 309
- Injuries: 7

The Luoyang Christmas fire was a fire that occurred in Luoyang, in China's Henan Province, on 25 December 2000, killing 309 people. The fire was started by welding that sparked flammable materials; while the construction and retail workers in the same building evacuated, the nightclub patrons were forgotten about and were overwhelmed in a flashover. This was one of the deadliest fires in China and the second deadliest nightclub fire in history.

== Background ==
=== Building ===
Dongdu Commercial Building was a commercial building, completed on 3 November 1990, then as Laocheng Mall. Prior to that, the site had mostly consisted commercial slums and before that, it was the site of a Fire God temple. It was located on the busiest part of Zhongzhou Road. The building had four floors above ground and two floors below ground. The building had four stairwells, each in one corner of the building. Fire doors existed at the entrance to stairwells for below ground level 1, above ground levels 1, 2 and 3. The southeast stairwells were fitted with a steel gate between the third and fourth floors. A lift existed at the northeast corner of the building, though it was out of service at the time of the fire.

Below ground level 2 was occupied by a furniture store and also as goods storage by the Dennis Department Store; from below ground level 1 to above ground level 2 were also used for retail by the department store. Level 3 was sparsely rented out to retailers. Level 4 contained the building management on the southern and eastern sides, a conference room on the northern side, a KTV club on the west side and the dance club in the centre.

Throughout the 1990s, four modification directives had been given by the fire department. Seeing a lack of action by the building owners, the fire safety inspector had written to the Luoyang city government, pleading them to shut down the building to no avail. Fire hazards found on inspections were a lack of a closeable firewall between the below ground and above ground levels, lack of automatic water sprinkler systems for the below ground levels, a damaged and unrepaired fire alarm system and three of the four stairwells to level 4 being locked. The building had been on a provincial list of 40 fire noncompliant buildings since 1997, but no effective action was taken; at the time of the fire, the building's operating license had been revoked but continued to operate illegally under the new joint management.

=== Renovations ===
Due to mismanagement, the building owners had struggled to operate the building successfully, eventually causing the unemployment of 541 workers there. The contract to jointly operate the building with the Dennis Department Store was intended to improve the building's environment and make it more attractive to consumers. Renovations started in 6 November, trial operations started on 25 December and it was intended to officially open it on 28 December. To prepare for the opening, many employees of the stores worked overnight to prepare the stock and shops. To separate the retail from the storage section for the soon to open department store, the retail manager of Dennis instructed a welder, Wang Chengtai to weld a metal plate at the stairwell between below ground level 1 and 2. However, the plate used to close the stairwell had two small holes in it, which were left as is until 25 December. Wang and the others that assisted him in welding were not licensed welders.

== Incident ==
On the night of the incident, over 400 people were celebrating Christmas in the dance club, over its rated capacity of 200 people. Meanwhile, Wang Chengtai was checking the electrical circuitry around the department store. At 8:20 pm, he was told by the director of Dennis to weld shut the two holes in the metal plate at the stairwell. As he was the only welder at the time, he was told to find some assistants to help him with the welding; for that, he enlisted the help of two fresh produce workers of the department store. After some initial troubles with powering on the blowtorch, Wang successfully turned it on with the help of Zhou Jian, an electrician also working that night. He subsequently tested the blowtorch, aiming it at one of the holes in the steel plate from about a fist away, emitting a shower of sparks through the hole and confirming that it was working as normal. Behind the plate, the level was filled with various fabrics and wood products, with ignition temperatures ranging from 205 to 430 °C, while the temperature of welding sparks have a temperature of 800 °C several seconds after leaving the electrode.

At 9 pm, as Wang was preparing the plate for welding, a construction worker came by and questioned Wang on whether it would be safe to weld, given that the contents behind the plate were too dark to see. As neither of them had torches, Wang passed a sparking welding rod through the hole for the construction worker to check, on which he noticed a bundle of processed wood smouldering, and immediately called out to nearby workers to put the fire out. While many rushed to try fight the fire, they faced difficulties, as they were only able to pour water through the two holes in the plate; a lack of pressure in the fire hoses resulted in the initial efforts at firefighting being futile. The fire brigades were only called around 30 minutes after the smouldering was noticed, after the managing vice-director of Dennis arrived at 9:20 pm on a routine visit in preparations for opening.

Though the smoke was starting to spread to below ground level 1 through the stairwell where the welding was taking place, the workers above ground were not yet aware of the danger, continuing to sort stock despite others attempting to put the fire out. Eventually, the deputy area manager of Dennis called for all workers to evacuate over the store's internal speaker system, leaving only the security staff to man the evacuation process of Dennis workers. Once the workers were evacuated to the plaza in front of the building, a roll call was attempted, but due to the chaos, it was not completed.

The director of Dongdu, upon noticing the smoke coming out of the northeast stairwell, ordered the door closed and opened the southwest and southeast doors. He also ordered the power to the whole building to be switched off. As the staff and construction workers of Dennis and the management of Dongdu made an escape, the hundreds of people partying and the office workers on level four were forgotten about, with no-one to warn them or to unlock the locked gates or doors, trapping them in darkness and dense smoke. Alternatively, according to Henan investigators, the fire burnt out the insulators of wiring at 9:38 pm, causing the blackout, though the people above the Dennis store levels were indeed forgotten.

The fire was extinguished by 12:45 am Tuesday. Some 800 police officers and firefighters and 26 fire engines rushed to the scene after receiving the call.

== Investigation ==
According to a report by fire investigators from Henan, up until 9:26 pm, the fire was still able to be brought under control with handheld extinguishers; up until to 9:32 pm, if fire sprinklers existed. Afterwards, the fire would have spread further north, creating a chimney effect with the northwest and northeast stairwells, all of which only had fire doors on certain levels. This would have propagated the smoke upwards, to level 4, where the nightclub and conference rooms were. A flashover occurred at 9:38 pm, reaching up to 40 Pa, blowing open windows on below ground level 1 that had been previously sealed by 1 cm of concrete; even more smoke was pushed up into level 4. Had a fire door existed for each floor, this would've significantly slowed the spread of the fire and smoke; the fire doors on below ground level 1, level 1 and 2 had kept the floors safe from fire though as a result also funneled all the smoke up to level 4.

On level 4, people died on the spot from smoke inhalation. Temperatures inside the nightclub was determined to have been at least 80 °C, up to 140 °C based on melting of plastic elements in the area. On level 2, temperatures near the stairwell reached 200 to 300 °C evidenced by charring on the fire door. Chemicals in the smoke included CO, HCN, CoCl_{2}, Acrolein, H_{2}S and others. After flashover, the smoke was estimated to have taken only 6 seconds to reach level 4, and 3.3 minutes to subsequently envelop the whole nightclub. With only one door to enter the nightclub and only one unlocked stairwell, any opportunity to escape was rapidly lost.

Out of 309 deaths, 308 were on the top floor; 248 people died in the main nightclub hall, 26 in the smaller nightclub room, 23 at the locked southwest stairwell, 11 along the corridor on the west side of the building and 1 in a karaoke room. The victims all showed signs of carbon monoxide poisoning and had noticeable soot around their nasal area; the reason for the large number of deaths was not due to burns or heat, but due to the rapid spread of toxic smoke.

== Aftermath ==
An emergency meeting was held early Tuesday morning in the province and in the afternoon, Shi Wanpeng, vice-minister of the State Economic and Trade Commission, also arrived in Luoyang. The Ministry of Public Security released an urgent circular, asking local governments to spare no efforts to ensure safety during the New Year's Day and the Spring Festival holidays.

Virtually all nightclubs in Luoyang were closed in the aftermath of the fire, due to mass checks finding fire hazards in almost all of them. The building was repaired and reopened for business after the fire, however, very few tenants returned; nearby streets had also been impacted, with the area no longer being bustling. Fire sprinklers were still only partially installed, as funding ran out before the system was fitted to the entire building.

== See also ==
- List of nightclub fires
- List of fires in China
- List of disasters in China by death toll

== Extended reading ==
Compilation of news articles on Sina.com
- "洛阳商厦特大火灾公审". Sina news. 2001. "page 1". Archived from the original on 27 February 2004. "page 2". Archived from the original on 7 November 2001.

Documentary
- 河南洛阳东都商厦12·25火灾. Editor:何杰, Scriptwriter:任志军, Photography:孙小磊. Duration: 13 minutes 45 seconds. Uploaded to QQ video, Bilibili video.
