= Shanxi Rift System =

Geological feature in China

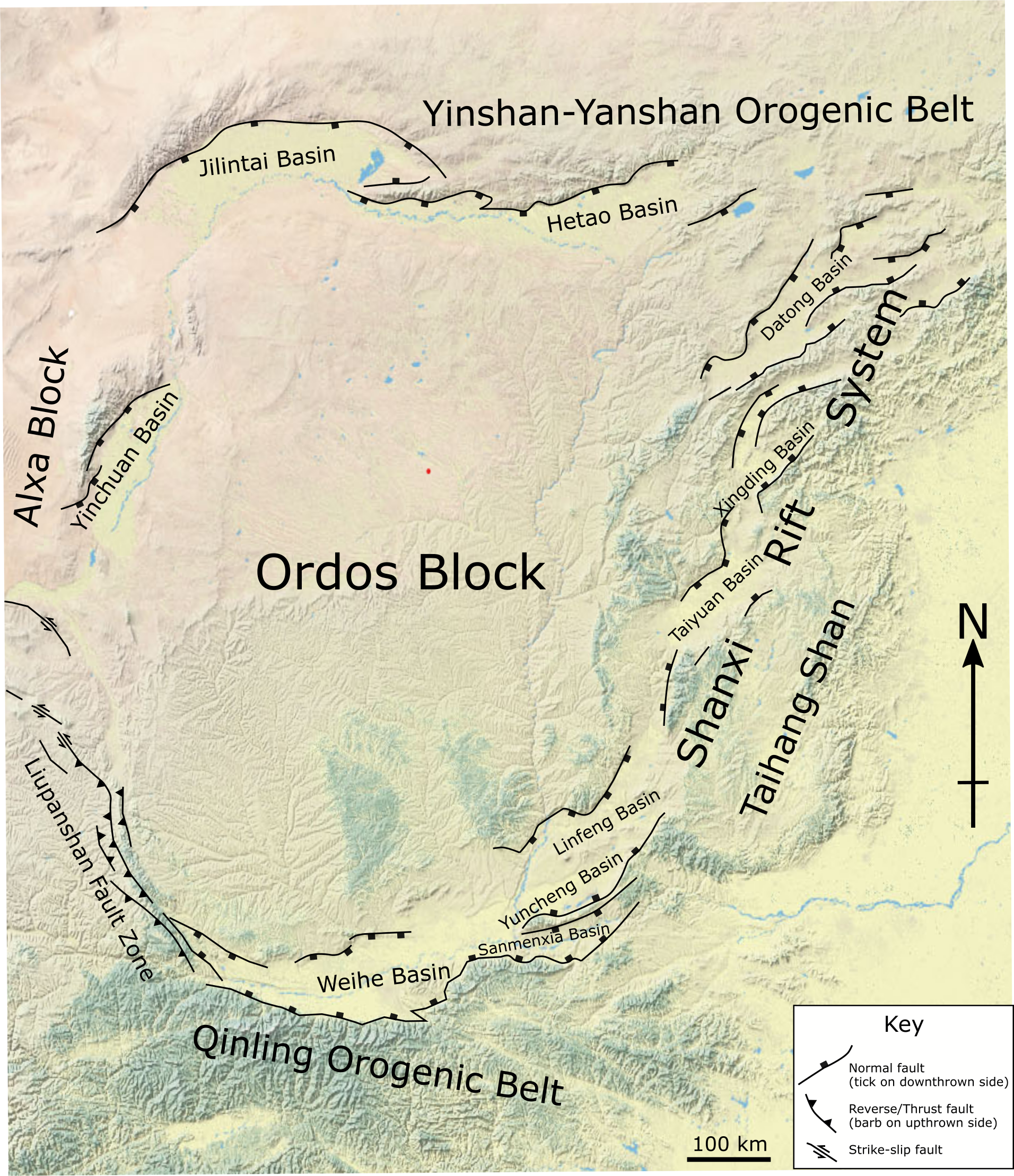
Map of the Shanxi Rift System along the eastern margin of the Ordos Block

The Shanxi Rift System or Fen–Wei Rift System is a zone of active extensional tectonics that forms the eastern margin of the Ordos Block in northern China. The zone extends for at least 900 km (560 mi) and runs south-southwest to north-northeast. The individual rift basins that make up the rift system have an overall en echelon geometry, consistent with a right lateral sense of strike-slip displacement across the zone. The basins contain a thick sedimentary sequence of Neogene age, which ranges from 2.0 to 3.8 km (1.2 to 2.4 mi) in thickness. The rift system is continuous with the Weihe Basin to the southwest, which became active during the Paleogene. Rupture of the major normal faults that bound the Weihe and Shanxi rift basins has caused many large and damaging historical earthquakes, including the 1303 Hongdong (>200,000 deaths), 1556 Shaanxi (830,000 deaths), 1626 Lingqiu (>5,200 deaths), 1695 Linfen (>52,600 deaths) and 1815 Pinglu (>13,000 deaths) events.

== Nomenclature ==
The Shanxi Rift System is named for the province of Shanxi as that defines the extent of the rift zone, apart from the Weihe Basin, which is in Shaanxi province. The combined Weihe and Shanxi rift systems are sometimes referred to as the Weihe-Shanxi Rift System. The alternative name, the Fen-Wei Rift System, derives from the Fen and the Wei Rivers which drain through most of the rift zone.

== Extent ==
The rift system runs for over 900 km (560 mi) between the Qinling orogenic belt in the south to the Yinshan-Yanshan orogenic belt in the north, varying in width from 40 to 120 km (25 to 75 mi). It has an overall S-shaped geometry, trending WSW–ENE to SW-NE at its southern and northern ends and trending SSW–NNE in the main part of the rift system.

== Basins ==
The main individual rift basins that make up the rift system, from south to north, are the Weihe, Sanmenxia, Yuncheng, Linfen, Taiyuan, Xinding and Datong basins.

=== Weihe Basin ===
The west–east trending Weihe Basin has a mainly half-graben geometry, thickening southwards into the large normal faults that form the boundary on its southern side with the mountains of the Qinling orogenic belt. The two main faults are the North Qinling Fault, which runs from the western end of the basin to just beyond Xi'an. To the east the main basin-bounding fault steps to the north in the form of the Huashan Fault, which continues eastward to near Lingbao, where it forms the southern boundary to the Sanmenxia Basin.

The maximum thickness of Cenozoic sedimentary fill in the basin is estimated to be in the range 4 to 6 km (2.5 to 3.7 mi). The oldest unit is thought to be of Late Eocene age, dating the onset of rifting in this basin to the Eocene. The sequence consists of continental clastic sedimentary rocks, deposited in alluvial, fluvial and lacustrine sedimentary environments. During the Paleogene the basin initiated as a result of NW–SE directed extension. After a brief period of NE–SW directed extension in the Pleistocene, the current tectonic setting, NNW–SSE directed extension began. GPS data are unable to constrain current displacement rates.

=== Sanmenxia Basin ===
The Sanmenxia Basin trends WSW–ENE and lies between the Qinling orogenic belt to the south and the Zhongtiao Mountains to the north. The basin is 120 km (75 mi) long and 20 to 30 km (12 to 19 mi) wide, with a maximum fill of about 4 km (2.5 mi). It is continuous with the Weihe Basin to the west. Tectonically it is bound to the south by the Sanmenxia-Lingbao Fault, which links to the eastern segment of the Huashan Fault, and to the north by a fault along the southern edge of the Zhongtiao range, the South Zhongtiaoshan Fault. The Sanmenxia Basin shares a similar history with the Weihe Basin, containing a thick sequence of continental clastic sedimentary rocks, with the oldest part of the succession being of Eocene age. Despite their similarities the two basins appear to have remained separate until at least the late Pliocene, when they were connected by the Yellow River.

=== Yuncheng Basin ===
This SW–NE trending basin is a strongly asymmetric half-graben with southeastward thickening into the large normal fault along the northwestern side of the Zhongtiao range, the North Zhongtiaoshan Fault. It contains a maximum thickness of over 5 km (3.1 mi) of sedimentary rocks, which extend back in age to the Late Miocene. The sequence thins northwards to a few hundred metres, with pre-Cenozoic basement rock locally exposed in the E'mei highlands.

=== Linfen Basin ===
The Linfen Basin lies to the north of the Yuncheng Basin, from which it is separated by the E'mei highlands. It has the opposite polarity, that is the boundary fault that controls the half-graben, the Louyunshan Fault, in this case lies on the northwest side of the basin, against the Luoyunshan range. The maximum thickness of the upper Miocene to recent sedimentary fill is in the range 1.8 to 2.2 km (1.1 to 1.4 mi).

=== Taiyuan Basin ===
This SW–NE trending basin is 148 km (92 mi)m in length and about 42 km (26 mi) in width, with a total area of 6,200 km^{2} (2,400 sq mi). It is bounded to the northwest by the Jiaocheng Fault and the southeast by the Taigu Fault. It is markedly asymmetric with a maximum thickness developed against the Jiaocheng Fault to the northwest of about 3.8 km (2.4 mi), with a sedimentary fill ranging in age from Pliocene to recent. The thickness in this basin reduces to less than 1 km (0.62 mi) on its southeastern edge.

=== Xinding Basin ===
Also known as the Xinzhou–Dingxian Basin, this SW–NE trending half-graben has its main faulted boundary on its southeastern margin as the Xizhoushan Fault against the Xizhouan range. The sedimentary fill of this basin reaches a maximum of about 1.8 km (1.1 mi). In some descriptions of the Shanxi Rift System, this basin name has been used to cover three sub-basins, the Dingxiang, Yuanping and Daixian. The Daixian sub-basin has a half-graben geometry and is bounded to the southeast by the Wutaishan Fault. It has a maximum sedimentary infill of about 1,800 m of Pliocene to recent age.

=== Datong Basin ===
Subsidence in the Datong Basin is controlled by the SW–NE trending, SE-dipping Kouquan Fault and the WSW–ENE trending, NNW-dipping Liulengshan Piedmont and Hengshan Piedmont faults. Other smaller basins form part of the northern sector of the rift system south and east of the Datong Basin. These include the Yangyuan Basin (controlled by the Liulengshan Fault), the Hunyuan Basin (controlled by the Hengshan Fault), the Yu-Guang Basin (controlled by the South Yu-Guang Basin Fault) and the Lingqiu Basin (controlled by the Taibaiweishan Fault), all of which have a half-graben geometry.

== Seismicity ==
The rift system is one of the most seismically active areas in northern China. There have been many major (M>6) earthquakes with epicentres in or close to the rift system, with 16 such events since 1300. The sequence of large earthquakes has been explained as mainly a result of modification of the stress field by each earthquake. Modelling of stress changes starting with the 1303 Hongdong earthquake, have estimated that three-quarters of M≥6.5 events in the rift system occurred in areas of stress increase.
