= 1993 Zhili toy factory fire =

Industrial disaster in Shenzhen, China

On 19 November 1993, a major fire occurred at the Zhili Handicraft Factory (致麗工藝製品廠) in Kuichong Town, Longgang District, Shenzhen, China. The fire resulted in 87 deaths and 51 injuries, making it the deadliest fire in Shenzhen's history. The disaster shocked both Hong Kong and mainland China. In the years following the disaster, labor groups launched cross-border efforts to demand compensation for the victims and their families. In response, Chinese authorities issued stricter nationwide mandates to improve fire safety standards, particularly in foreign-owned factories, and to strengthen worker safety training. The fire also played a significant role in accelerating the drafting and passage of the Labour Law of the People's Republic of China, which went into effect less than two years after the fire on 1 January 1995.

== Background ==
The Zhili Handicraft Factory was owned by a Shenzhen company (深圳葵涌鎮經濟發展公司). Lo Chiu-chuen (勞釗泉) (Note: He was widely reported as the owner of the factory.) was the owner of a Hong Kong toy company (香港致高實業有限公司), which signed a processing contract with the factory. The factory was jointly operated by the two companies. The Shenzhen side appointed Huang Guoguang (黃國光) as the factory director, while the Hong Kong side appointed Leung (梁建國) as the manager. Which side held more responsibility over the fire was disputed. (Note: In court, factory director Huang Guoguang stated that all matters within the factory, including the installation of fire prevention equipment, required Lau Chiu-chuen's personal approval. However, the contract explicitly assigned fire safety responsibilities to the factory director.)

The construction of the Zhili Handicraft Factory was completed in May 1988, and it started operation in 1989. It employed over 400 workers, mostly young female migrant laborers from rural areas.

The factory building was housed in a three-story reinforced concrete building with a total floor area of 2,166 square meters. The production, warehousing, and packaging operations were spread across the floors. The first floor housed a cutting workshop and warehouse, the second floor was used for hand-sewing and packaging, and the third floor contained the machine-sewing workshop.

== The incident ==
On November 19, 1993, at approximately 1:25 PM, a fire broke out in the northeast corner warehouse on the first floor of the factory. The fire quickly spread southeast and west along the wind. Due to unsafe conditions and poor safety management, the fire escalated rapidly. At the time of the fire, 404 workers were working.

At 1:40 PM, the local fire brigade was alerted and dispatched 21 firefighters with two trucks. Due to the lack of nearby water sources and the fire's rapid spread, the blaze was difficult to control. Then, Shenzhen authorities further mobilized 20 fire trucks from 12 different brigades, and over 200 People's Liberation Army soldiers joined the firefighting efforts.

The fire was largely contained by 2:45 PM and extinguished by 4:20 PM.

== Causes ==
The fire was triggered by an electrical short circuit caused by exposed wiring in the warehouse. The electrical system was improperly installed and failed to meet safety standards, suffering from long-term overloading. The wiring lacked proper insulation and protective conduits, and large amounts of combustible materials were stored dangerously close to the power lines. Furthermore, instead of a fuse, the main power switch used a 25-millimeter-thick copper wire, which did not break the circuit during the fire.

Fire safety regulations were violated. Windows were welded shut and covered with wire mesh to prevent theft, blocking ventilation and escape routes. Of the four emergency exits on the first floor, three were locked or welded shut, leaving only one narrow and partially obstructed exit accessible on the southeast side. This severely limited evacuation options for the approximately 404 workers inside, many of whom became trapped due to these blocked exits and stairways.

Compounding these issues, the factory lacked adequate firefighting infrastructure. There were no fire hydrants nearby, forcing firefighters to source water from over a kilometer away, which delayed their response and hampered efforts to control the blaze.

== Casualties and impact ==
The fire resulted in 87 deaths and 51 injuries, making it the deadliest fire in Shenzhen's history. It also caused over 8 million yuan in direct economic losses.

== See also ==
- List of fires in China
- Triangle Shirtwaist Factory fire, which played a role in improving labor legislation in the US
- Kader Toy Factory fire, which occurred in Thailand earlier the same year
