= 1987 Black Dragon fire =

Wildfire in China and the Soviet Union

- Date: May 6 – June 2, 1987
- Location: Greater Khingan Range, Northeastern China; Parts of the Soviet Union

Statistics
- Burned area: 2,500,000 acres (1,000,000 ha)
- Land use: Forest; residential; timber

Impacts
- Deaths: 211
- Injuries: 266

Ignition
- Cause: Drought; forest mismanagement; gas spill

The 1987 Black Dragon fire, also known as the 1987 Daxing'anling wildfire (Chinese: 大兴安岭特大森林火灾), was the deadliest forest fire in the People's Republic of China. The fire broke out in Daxing'anling Prefecture, Heilongjiang, on May 6, 1987. It also spread into the Soviet Union. The burning lasted almost a month, when it was finally stopped on June 2, 1987. The fire covered about 10,000 km^{2} (2,500,000 acres), of which 6,500 km^{2} (2,500 sq mi), was forest; it destroyed 7.3 million hectares (18 million acres) of forest, including one-sixth of China's entire timber reserves. About 266 people were wounded and 211 died in the fire, leaving 50,000 homeless. It was one of the largest wildfires ever to occur and the largest to strike China in over 300 years.

== The fire ==
The Black Dragon fire originated in the coniferous Da Hinggan Forests in the Greater Khingan Range, a mountain range in northeastern China. In 1987, the area surrounding the Amur River in the region had been unusually hot and was experiencing a drought, leading to an overabundance of parched vegetation. These conditions were ideal for a large wildfire to occur. Because the area was sparsely populated at the time, the exact cause of the fire was not very clear at first; any small ignition could have turned into a major firestorm in the conditions present. Later and widely believed Chinese reports state that the fire was started "when an untrained 18-year-old worker accidentally ignited gas spilled from his brush cutter." According to Harrison Salisbury, the roots of the disaster lay in excessive cutting down of trees without any effort to let the forest regrow, which triggered multiple fires in the region. Whatever the causes were, the resulting firestorm quickly gained momentum, fueled by high winds in the region. Workers reported their truck engines stopping as the fire deprived the oxygen supply in the air as well as burning projectiles raining down on them ahead of the fire. A total of 191 people were killed by the fire, and a further 250 were left injured. In addition, 33,000 Chinese were made homeless. It remains the deadliest forest fire in the People's Republic of China.

== Response ==
Although both countries were affected heavily by the fire, China and the Soviet Union responded very differently. China, despite its shortage of advanced firefighting equipment, sent over 60,000 soldiers and workers to try and extinguish the fire. Because the forest was a major source of wood for China as well as the fact that it was close to the Gobi Desert and thus a factor in desertification in northern China, China spent much effort on extinguishing the flames. The Soviet Union, on the other hand, simply let the fire burn out on its side of the border because its vast timber reserves were not seriously threatened by the fire. When the fire finally stopped over a month later, the differences in responses were clear: The Soviet Union had lost more forest (15 million acres compared to 3 million in China), while China was more devastated economically.

In the aftermath, China punished individuals for causing the fire; the aforementioned 18-year-old worker, along with his employer, was jailed. The forestry minister Yang Zhong (杨钟) was fired. In addition, a local fire chief who saved his house and left the rest of his town to burn was sentenced to four years in prison.

The lessons learned from the Black Dragon fire helped to improve responses to wildfires throughout the world as well as demonstrate the impact that governments can have on the environment. The effect that the fire had on the environment in the region generated new-found concern and speculation about the future of the forest's ecology.

== See also ==
- List of fires in China
- Harbin SH-5, Chinese maritime patrol amphibious aircraft used in the 1987 wildfire
