= List of famines in China =

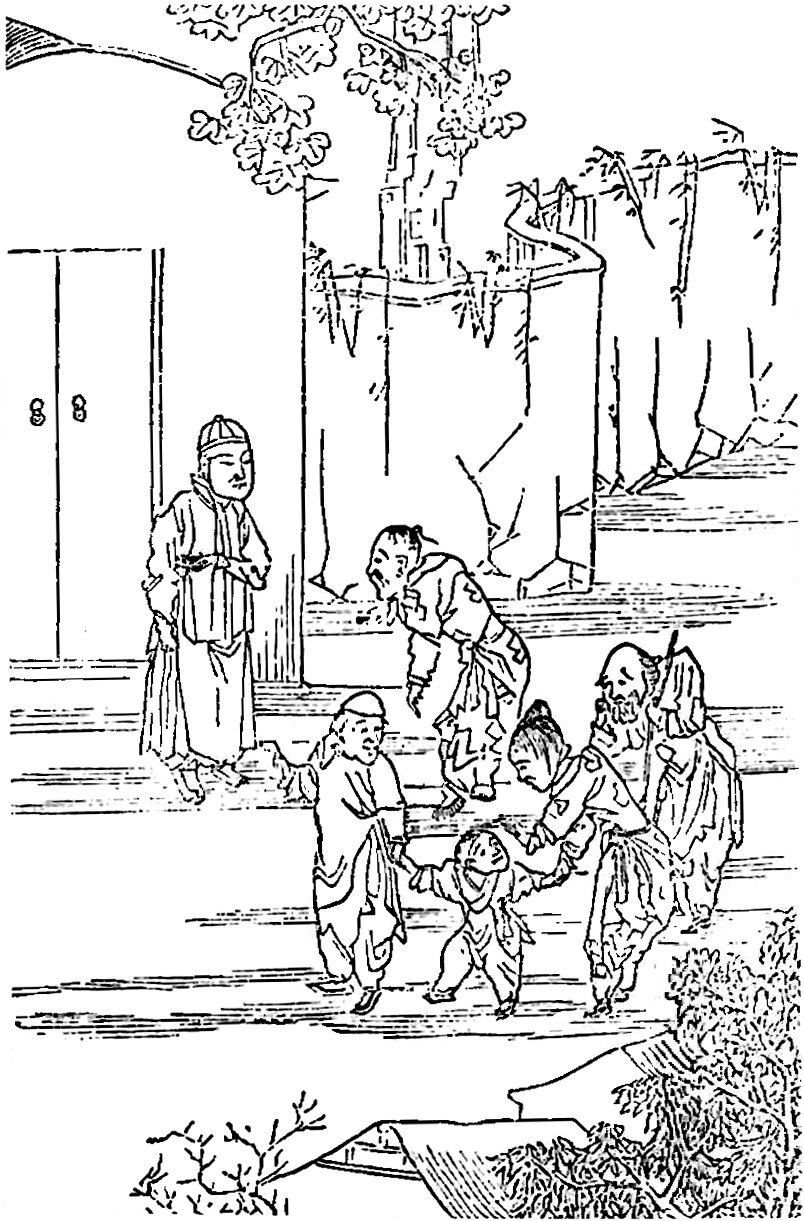
Victims of a famine forced to sell their children from The Famine in China (1878)

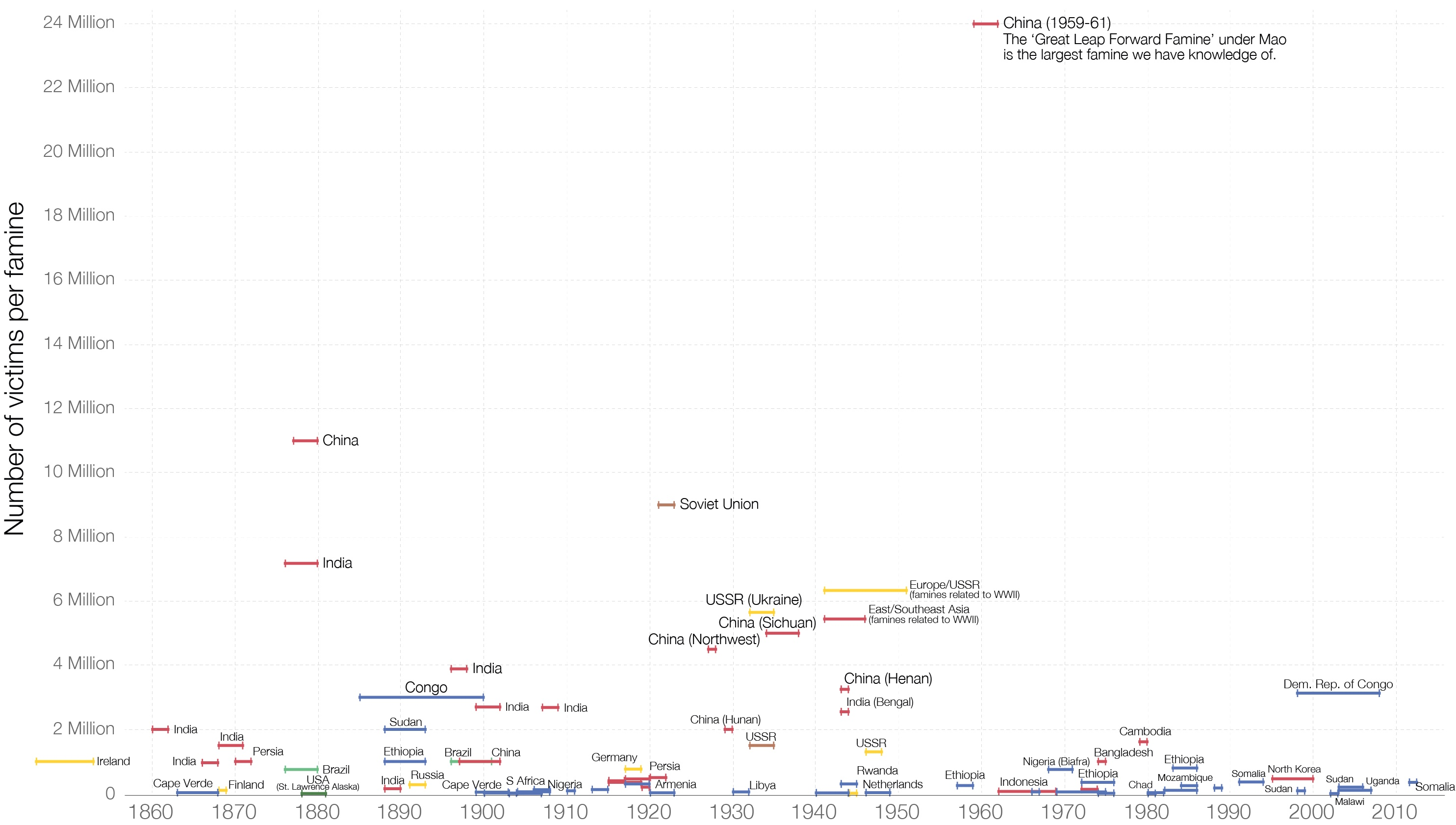
Global famines history

This is a list of famines in China, part of the series of lists of disasters in China. Between 108 BC and 1911 AD, there were no fewer than 1,828 recorded famines in China, or once nearly every year in one province or another. The famines varied in severity.

== Famines in China ==
Name	Time	Region	Context	Estimated number of dead
Mid-Tang Famine	714-719		Natural disasters, including a locust plague in 716. Tang Emperor Xuanzong subsequently instituted mandatory granary supplies and set fixed prices on grain.	0.4 to 1 million
Xìngzhēn Disaster	784-785	Northern China	Devastating locust plague.	Millions dead or displaced.
	873–884		Drought, part of a broader climatic drying and cooling period, caused disastrous failures in crop harvest, leading to famine and a peasant rebellion; Huang Chao captured capital	Tens of thousands face starvation.
Chinese famine of 1333-1337	1333–1337			6 million
Hongxi famine	1425			
Jingtai Slough	1440-1455	Zhejiang, Shanxi, Shaanxi, northern Jiangsu, Shandong	Cold conditions	
	1477-1487		Flooding of the Yellow River.	
Hongzhi famine	1494-1495		Persistent drought, followed by flooding in northern China and the collapse of the Shandong dam. Worsened by climatic shifts in the Northern Hemisphere.	
	1526	Beijing		
	1543-1544	Zhejiang		
Wanli Slough I	1586-1589		Flooding followed by drought. coinciding with La Niña climate disruption	Most lethal famine of the 1500's
Wanli Slough II	1615-1619		Drought, flood and sandstorms from deforestation.	
Chongzhen drought	1627–1644	Beijing, southern Hebei, northern Henan, and western Shandong, along the Yellow, Wei, and Fen rivers in Shaanxi and the Yangtze River delta.	One of the most severe droughts in Chinese history, leading to the collapse of the Ming dynasty in 1644	2 million
Northern Chinese Famine of 1743–44	1743–1744	Counties within 100 miles of Beijing (including Zhili)	Drought	
Haizi famine	1755–1756		Drought and flood	70% of the poorer farmers of Rugao county
	1810– 1811	Hebei	Flood	11 million
The Great Jiaqing Famine in Yunnan	1815– 1817	Yunnan, with hunger in most of China	Microthermal climate disaster tied to the eruption of the Tambora volcano	Tens to hundreds of thousands
	1846–1851	Hebei, Zhejiang and Hubei	Flood	15 million (45 million population decrease, with unknown proportion emigrating)
	1857		Flooding in Hubei and Shandong, combined with instability due to the Taiping Rebellion and Nian Rebellion.	8 million
	1851–1873		First Opium War, Treaty of Nanjing, Nian Rebellion, Taiping Rebellion, flooding in 1863 and 1867, as well as drought.	10–30 million people
Northern Chinese Famine of 1876–79	1876– 1879	Mostly Shanxi (5.5 million dead), also in Zhili (2.5 million), Henan (1 million), Shaanxi and Shandong (0.5 million).	Drought, decades of declining grain production relative to population size.	9.5 to 13 million
Northern Chinese Famine of 1901	1901	Shanxi, Shaanxi, Inner Mongolia	The drought from 1898-1901 led to a fear of famine, which was a leading cause of Boxer Rebellion. The famine eventually came in Spring 1901.	0.2 million in Shanxi, the worst hit province.
Chinese famine of 1906–1907	1906-07	northern Anhui, northern Jiangsu		25 million
Chinese famine of 1920-1921	1920–1921	Henan, Shandong, Shanxi, Shaanxi, southern Zhili (Hebei)		0.5 million
Chinese famine of 1928–30	1928–1930	Northern China	Drought, wartime constraints, and inefficiency of relief	6 to 10 million
Sichuan famine of 1936-37	1936-1937	Sichuan, Henan and Gansu	Drought and civil war.	5 million in Sichuan, up to 50 million displaced as 'famine refugees'
1942–1943 famine	1942–1943	Mainly Henan	Second Sino-Japanese War	0.7 to 1.4 million
Great Chinese Famine	1959–1961	Half of the country, in particular Anhui (18% died), Chongqing (15% died), Sichuan (13% died), Guizhou (11% died), Hunan (8% died)	Great Leap Forward, Floods, Droughts, Typhoons, Insect Invasion	15 to 55 million

== Responding to famines ==
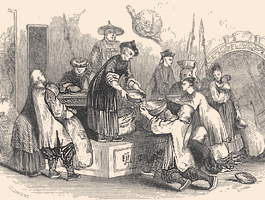
Chinese officials engaged in famine relief, 19th-century engraving

In China, famines have been an ongoing problem for thousands of years. From the Shang dynasty (16th–11th century BC) until the founding of modern China, chroniclers have regularly described recurring disasters. There have always been times and places where rains have failed, especially in the northwest of China, and this has led to famine.

It was the task of the Emperor of China to provide, as necessary, to famine areas and transport foods from other areas and to distribute them. The reputation of an emperor depended on how he succeeded. National famines occurred even when the drought areas were too large, especially when simultaneously larger areas of flooded rivers were over their banks and thus additionally crop failures occurred, or when the central government did not have sufficient reserves. If an emperor could not prevent a famine, he lost prestige and legitimacy. It was said that he had lost the Mandate of Heaven.

Qing China built an elaborate system designed to minimize famine deaths. The system was destroyed in the Taiping Rebellion of the 1850s.

== See also ==
- List of disasters in China by death toll
- History of famines in the Far East
- List of famines
