= List of fires in China =

This is a list of notable fires in China, part of the series of lists of disasters in China.

This list includes Manchukuo.

== Structural fire ==
=== Entertainment venues ===
Particularly fires in theatres and night clubs.

Date, location	Name	Deaths, injured	Description
18 February 1977, Khorgos, Xinjiang	61st Regiment Farm fire	694, 161	A war movie was being shown at a hall during the Chinese New Year. A child set off a firecracker and ignited wreaths for the late Mao Zedong, which for over five months no one dared to dispose of. Most deaths were the children of the regiment at their military-agricultural colony.
26 February 1937, Andong (now Dandong), Manchukuo	Manchurian Dance Club fire	650, 28	During a play, fire spread from a stove in the backstage room to the ceiling, which quickly spread to the lobby. A latch on the main entrance prevented attendees from escaping.
8 December 1994, Karamay, Xinjiang	Karamay fire	325, 130	Students were entertaining visiting officials at a theatre. When the fire broke out, students were ordered to remain seated to allow officials to walk out first.
25 December 2000, Luoyang, Henan	Luoyang Christmas fire	309, 7	Sparks caused by welders triggered a fire in the basement, construction workers and retail staff evacuated, forgetting about the nightclub patrons trapped in the upper floors of the building.
27 November 1994, Fuxin, Liaoning	Yiyuan Disco fire	233, 4	A sofa caught fire from a lit cigarette and newspaper, the fire spread and the buildings quickly collapsed. One of the escape doors was locked, which contributed to the high death toll.
29 March 2000, Jiaozuo, Henan	Paradise Cinema fire	74, ?	A fire broke out at an adult cinema. The high death toll was attributed to the owner sealing the entrance to avoid police intrusions.
24 April 1995, Ürümqi, Xinjiang	Ürümqi karaoke club fire	51, ?	A fire broke out at an illegal karaoke club. The club, which had been ordered to shut down a week prior, had exits that were blocked or too narrow, which exacerbated the death toll.
January 2024, Xinyu, Jiangxi	2024 Jiangxi mall fire	39, 9	The fire broke out in the basement of a shopping mall.
July 2024, Zigong, Sichuan	2024 Sichuan mall fire	16, ?	The fire broke out at a shopping mall.
October 2020, Taiyuan, Shanxi	2020 Taiyuan theme park fire	13, 15	The fire broke out at a theme park.
April 2021, Chizhou, Anhui	2021 Chizhou mall fire	4, ?	The fire broke out at a shopping mall.

=== Non-entertainment venues ===
Most fires from 1949 to 1979 were not notable due to lack of records.

Date, location	Name	Deaths, injured	Description
6 January 1878, Tianjin	Tianjin soup kitchen fire	2 000	The gate of the soup kitchen was always locked to prevent the hunger from causing social unrest, which prevented evacuation in case of fire.
February 1975, Haicheng, Liaoning	Haicheng earthquake	341, 980	The earthquake evacuees lived in self-made tents, which caught fire.
15 February 1959, Yanyuan, Sichuan	Longtang Reservoir fire (under-construction)	197, 86	Fire started when all the staff were attending a meeting.
5 January 1960, Tongren, Guizhou	Tongren Airport fire (under-construction)	175, 5	A fire broke out during construction at the Tongren Fenghuang Airport. It is the deadliest airport fire in China.
8 January 1965, Yuli, Xinjiang	Second Tarim Field fire	172, 10	Most of the deaths were sent-down youth from Shanghai in the 35th Regiment at their military-agricultural colony.
19 November 1993, Shenzhen, Guangdong	Zhili toy factory fire	87, 47	Managers of the factory blocked exits and windows to avoid workers stealing toys, which exacerbated the death toll.
13 December 1993, Fuzhou, Fujian	Gaofu textiles warehouse fire	61, ?	A fire started from the fourth floor of the warehouse and spread to workshops and dormitories. It was caused by arson.
15 February 2004, Wufeng, Zhejiang	Wufeng temple fire	41, 3	Burning incense ignited the bamboo, causing a fire which scorched the temple within three minutes. Two victims died of their injuries in the hospital.
22 April 2000, Qingzhou, Shandong	Qingzhou chicken processing plant fire	38, ?	A fire broke out at a chicken processing plant.
30 June 2000, Jiangmen, Guangdong	Jiangmen fireworks factory fire	38, ?	A fire broke out at a fireworks factory in Jiangmen, which then caused an explosion.
27 November 1996, Shanghai	Shanghai residential building fire	36, ?	Two mentally disabled men committed arson at a residential building.
13 February 1997, Shenzhen, Guangdong	Shenzhen bus fire	33, ?	A fire broke out on a bus driving 65 migrant workers to Dongguan.
21 September 1997, Jinjiang, Fujian	Jinjiang shoe factory fire	32, ?	A disgruntled worker set fire to a shoe factory.
13 March 1995, Anshan, Liaoning	Anshan hotel fire	28, 12	A hotel on the top floor of a department store caught fire.
16 June 2002, Haidian district, Beijing	Lanjisu internet cafe fire	25, 13	Disgruntled youngsters set fire to a crowded two-story internet cafe in Beijing's university district after being banned. This was the deadliest fire in Beijing in more than 50 years.
April 2025, Liaoyang, Liaoning	2025 Liaoyang restaurant fire	22, 3	The fire broke out at a restaurant.
30 March 2003, Qingdao, Shandong	Qingdao Chia Tai fire	21, ?	A fire broke out at a food processing plant. The building collapsed and trapped workers inside.
26 December 1999, Changchun, Jilin	Changchun bathhouse fire	20, ?	A fire broke out in a bathhouse in the basement of a hotel in Changchun.

== Forest fires ==
Date, location	Name	Deaths, injured	Description
May–June 1987, Heilongjiang	Black Dragon fire	193, 226	Bureaucratic leadership led to the extremely slow response to the fire.
March–April 2019, Muli County, Sichuan	2019 Muli forest fire	30, ?	The majority of the fatalities were firefighters.
March 2020, Xichang, Sichuan	2020 Xichang forest fire	19, 3	All but one of the fatalities were firefighters.
March 2019, Qinyuan County, Shanxi	2019 Qinyuan forest fire	6, 1	All of the casualties were firefighters.

== Urban conflagration ==
Over the history of China, three cities stood out to have suffered from repetitive urban conflagrations, including Jiankang during the Northern and Southern dynasties, Hangzhou during Song dynasty and Chongqing between late Qing and the early republic.

== See also ==
- List of disasters in China by death toll
- List of fires
