= Lingqiu County =

Lingqiu County 灵丘县 Lingkiu
- County
- Jueshan Brick Pagoda (觉山寺)

- Location of the seat in Shanxi
- Coordinates: 39°26′33″N 114°14′04″E
- Country: People's Republic of China
- Province: Shanxi
- Prefecture-level city: Datong
- Time zone: UTC+8 (China Standard)

Lingqiu County
- Traditional Chinese: 靈邱縣
- Simplified Chinese: 灵丘县
Transcriptions
Standard Mandarin
- Hanyu Pinyin: Língqiū Xiàn
- Wade–Giles: Ling-ch‘iu Hsien

Lingqiu County is a county under the administration of Datong City, in the northeast of Shanxi Province, China, bordering Hebei province to the east.

== History ==
Under the Han, Lingqiu County was part of Dai Prefecture. In 1626, the county suffered a magnitude 7.0 earthquake with the loss of more than 5,200 lives.

== Climate ==
Climate data for Lingqiu, elevation 939 m (3,081 ft), (1991–2020 normals, extremes 1981–2010)
Month	Jan	Feb	Mar	Apr	May	Jun	Jul	Aug	Sep	Oct	Nov	Dec	Year
Record high °C (°F)	11.2 (52.2)	19.7 (67.5)	27.0 (80.6)	35.5 (95.9)	36.1 (97.0)	39.9 (103.8)	41.5 (106.7)	35.7 (96.3)	34.3 (93.7)	28.6 (83.5)	22.3 (72.1)	14.9 (58.8)	41.5 (106.7)
Mean daily maximum °C (°F)	−0.2 (31.6)	3.8 (38.8)	10.4 (50.7)	18.2 (64.8)	24.1 (75.4)	27.8 (82.0)	28.8 (83.8)	27.3 (81.1)	22.9 (73.2)	16.4 (61.5)	7.9 (46.2)	0.8 (33.4)	15.7 (60.2)
Daily mean °C (°F)	−8.6 (16.5)	−4.5 (23.9)	2.3 (36.1)	10.2 (50.4)	16.6 (61.9)	20.8 (69.4)	22.6 (72.7)	20.9 (69.6)	15.4 (59.7)	8.6 (47.5)	0.1 (32.2)	−6.8 (19.8)	8.1 (46.6)
Mean daily minimum °C (°F)	−14.7 (5.5)	−11.0 (12.2)	−4.4 (24.1)	2.7 (36.9)	9.2 (48.6)	14.3 (57.7)	17.4 (63.3)	15.8 (60.4)	9.5 (49.1)	2.5 (36.5)	−5.5 (22.1)	−12.3 (9.9)	2.0 (35.5)
Record low °C (°F)	−26.5 (−15.7)	−25.6 (−14.1)	−21.8 (−7.2)	−8.9 (16.0)	−2.7 (27.1)	4.5 (40.1)	7.7 (45.9)	5.5 (41.9)	−1.0 (30.2)	−11.3 (11.7)	−22.8 (−9.0)	−26.9 (−16.4)	−26.9 (−16.4)
Average precipitation mm (inches)	1.4 (0.06)	2.9 (0.11)	5.9 (0.23)	16.1 (0.63)	37.5 (1.48)	64.3 (2.53)	104.8 (4.13)	84.6 (3.33)	61.8 (2.43)	22.1 (0.87)	8.3 (0.33)	1.5 (0.06)	411.2 (16.19)
Average precipitation days (≥ 0.1 mm)	1.5	2.3	3.6	4.8	8.1	12.1	13.4	11.8	9.6	5.6	2.9	1.6	77.3
Average snowy days	2.4	3.9	3.6	1.2	0	0	0	0	0	0.4	3.1	2.7	17.3
Average relative humidity (%)	49	45	43	43	48	59	72	76	72	62	56	52	56
Mean monthly sunshine hours	189.8	189.8	234.7	242.6	265.0	230.1	211.0	211.7	205.9	210.3	187.4	185.3	2,563.6
Percentage possible sunshine	63	62	63	61	59	52	47	50	56	62	63	64	59
Source: China Meteorological Administration
