= 1622 North Guyuan earthquake =

Earthquake in Ningxia, China

- Location within China
- Local date: October 25, 1622
- Magnitude: 7.0 M_{s}
- Epicenter: 36.5°N 106.3°E
- Max. intensity: MMI X (Extreme)
- Casualties: 12,000

The 1622 North Guyuan earthquake struck Ningxia, China on 25 October with a magnitude of 7.0 M_{s} and a maximum Mercalli intensity of X (Extreme). It was the only recorded big earthquake in western China for 148 years, between 1561 and 1709. The earthquake occurred on the "rake of the Zhongwei-Tongxin fault", with a mid-seismogenic depth of about 15 kilometres (9.3 mi).

== See also ==
- List of earthquakes in China
- List of historical earthquakes
