= Dabei Monastery =

Buddhist temple in Tianjin, China

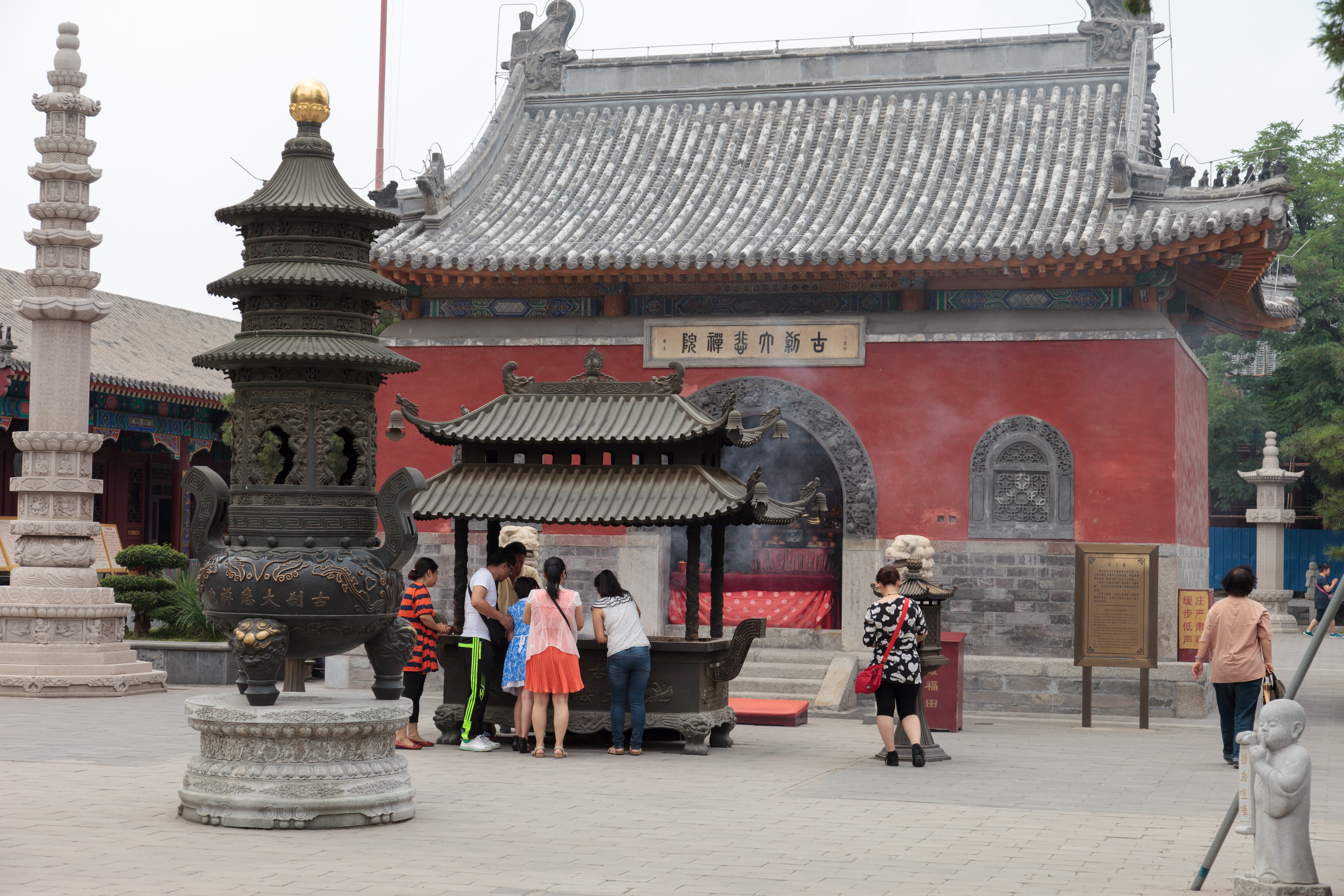
Tianjin Dabei monastery

The Dabei Monastery (Chinese: 大悲寺; pinyin: Dàbēi Sì; lit. 'Great Compassion Temple') is a Buddhist temple in the City of Tianjin, China.

The monastery was first built during the Ming dynasty, but has been heavily rebuilt and renovated since and consists now of the West Monastery from 1669 and the East Monastery from 1940. It is the largest and oldest in town covering 10,600 m^{2} (114,000 sq ft).

== West Temple and East Temple ==
The temple houses the Tianjin Buddhist Institute and exhibits many ancient statues. The Dabei Buddhist Monastery consists of two parts: an old monastery and a new monastery. These two parts are also known as the West Temple and the East Temple. The West Temple is the older of the two, built in 1669 during the Qing dynasty. The East Temple was built in 1940 by the monk Long Xian. The old monastery refers to the three great halls in the west yard. The construction of the old monastery started in the beginning of the Qing dynasty, and was renovated in the eighth ruling year of the Kangxi Emperor from the Qing dynasty. The West Temple includes the Tianjin Buddhist Institute, which encompasses the Wenwu Hall and the Buddhist Abbot Hall. The East Temple area is a wonderful collection of Buddhist-architecture buildings, most notable being the four great halls: Dabei, Grand, Tianwang Hall, and Dizang Hall. The statue of Sakyamuni is located in the Daxiong Palace in the east yard of the new monastery and was erected during the Ming dynasty. The entire Sakyamuni Statue is 7 meters high, weighs 6 tons, and has 9,999 small Buddhas carved on the lotus throne. Inside the Great Compassion Hall is located a 3.6-meter-high clay statue of Thousand-hand Kwan-yin.

== Famous relic ==
The monastery was once famous for holding a skull relic of Xuanzang, however, the relic was presented to India in 1956 when it was taken to Nalanda - allegedly by the Dalai Lama - and presented to India. The relic is now in the Patna Museum. And from then on, Great Compassion monastery takes the image of Xuanzang Master instead of the spirit bones for the worship of the Buddhist. There are memorials for Xuanzang Master and Hongyi Master in the east yard, while the west yard becomes an office for Cultural Relic Palace, Abbot Palace and Buddhist Association of China Tianjin Branch. In the Cultural Relic Palace of the west yard, there many collections from every dynasties since Wei and Jin Period including hundreds of Buddha statues which are made of various materials from bronze, iron, stone to wood.

== Vegetarian food ==
Dabei Great Monastery is the only monastery in Tianjin that provides vegetarian food to the public. Food made by the famous Tianjin Dabei Buddhist Monastery Vegetarian Food Corporation is served in the monastery, which includes Longevity Perch present basket, soybean vegetarian, multi-vitamin-calcium noodles, deepfreeze eight precious vegetarian steamed-buns, vegetarian dumplings, etc.

== Location ==
The address of the temple is Tianwei Road, Hebei District (河北区天纬路; Héběiqū Tiānwěilù). It is located about 2 km West of Tianjin North Railway Station and can be reached via the bus lines 1, 2, 4, 12, 18, 34, 177, 609, 609, 610, 611, 619, 632, 641, 646, 659, 670, 671, 818, 861, 878, 904 that stop at the Jingangqiao Station (金钢桥; Jīngāngqiáo) on Zhongshan Rd (中山路; Zhōngshānlù).
