= 1303 Hongdong earthquake =

Earthquake in northern China (25 September 1303)

- Local date: September 25, 1303
- Magnitude: M_{w} 7.2–7.6
- Epicenter: 36.8°N 111.7°E
- Max. intensity: MMI XI (Extreme)
- Casualties: Three different records: 170,000, 200,000+ and 270,000.

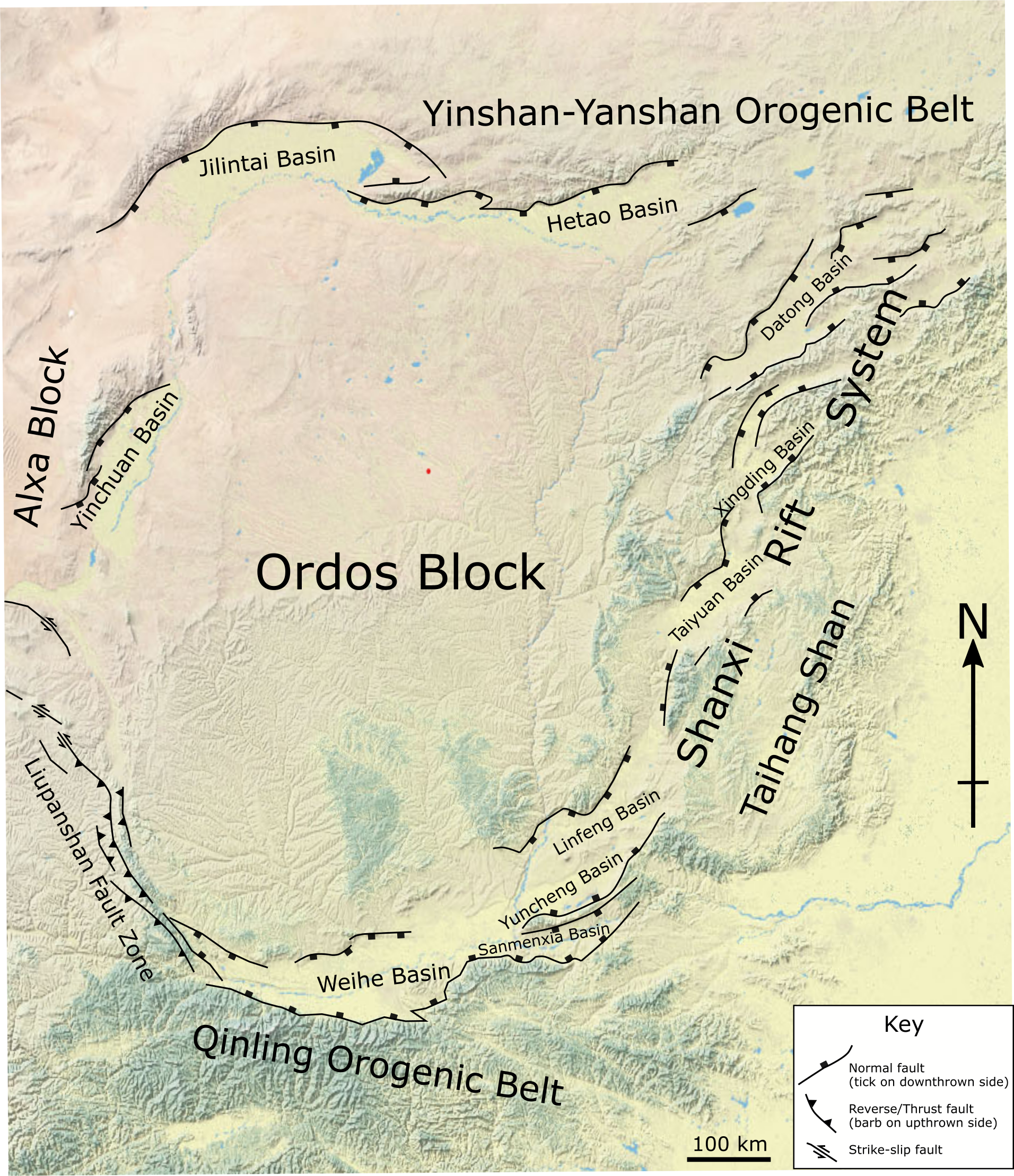
Map of the Shanxi Rift System along the eastern margin of the Ordos Block

The 1303 Hongdong earthquake occurred in Yuan dynasty of the Mongol Empire, on September 25. The shock was estimated to have a moment magnitude of 7.6 and it had a maximum Mercalli intensity of XI (Extreme). This was one of the most deadly earthquakes in China, in turn making it one of the top disasters in China by death toll.

== Geology ==
In 2018, the epicentre was revised to be at 36.8°N 111.7°E in what is now Xiamenzhen, to the southwest of the seat of Lingshi County, Shanxi. The epicentre had previously been determined to be 60 km south, in what is now Hongtong County. The earthquake likely occurred on the Taigu fault zone in Shanxi that part bounds the Taiyuan Basin, part of the Shanxi Rift System, and several scarps and uplifts of local faults were seen as evidence of this. The Taigu fault zone has not experienced any measurable activity since the 1303 earthquake. The magnitude was calculated by modern seismologists to be 8.0 on the moment magnitude scale, though it is impossible to say for sure due to lack of accurate geological data.

== Damage and casualties ==
Historical records and inscriptions typically asserted one of the three numbers to be the death toll: 170,000, 200,000+ and 270,000. This was one of the deadliest earthquakes in China, in turn making it one of the top disasters in China by death toll.

In the nearby towns of Zhaocheng and Hongdong, every major temple and school building collapsed and over half the towns' populations perished. Every building in Huo county, Shanxi was destroyed. In Taiyuan and Pingyang, nearly 100,000 houses collapsed and over 200,000 people died from collapsing buildings and loess caves in a similar manner to the situation that would be experienced 253 years later in the 1556 Shaanxi earthquake. Cracks in the ground turned into miniature rivers, and many canals in Shanxi Province were destroyed, along with city walls. Some reports stated that the earthquake even levelled mountains and hills, altering the topographic make-up of the region. Landslides and soil subsidence and liquefaction triggered by the shaking were a likely root cause of these large-scale environmental changes. Rebuilding was generally slow, owing to the destroyed infrastructure of Shanxi and was interrupted by several other earthquakes in the following years.

The 1303 Hongdong earthquake, though currently the last to have occurred on its fault system, marked the start of a centuries-long episode of heightened earthquake activity throughout China, the first of several to occur up to the end of the twentieth century. It was also the first of many examples of earthquakes that demonstrated the tendency of earthquakes in China to strike near loess plateaus.

== See also ==
- List of disasters in China by death toll
- List of earthquakes in China
- List of historical earthquakes
