= Chinese famine of 1920–1921 =

Famine in the Republic of China

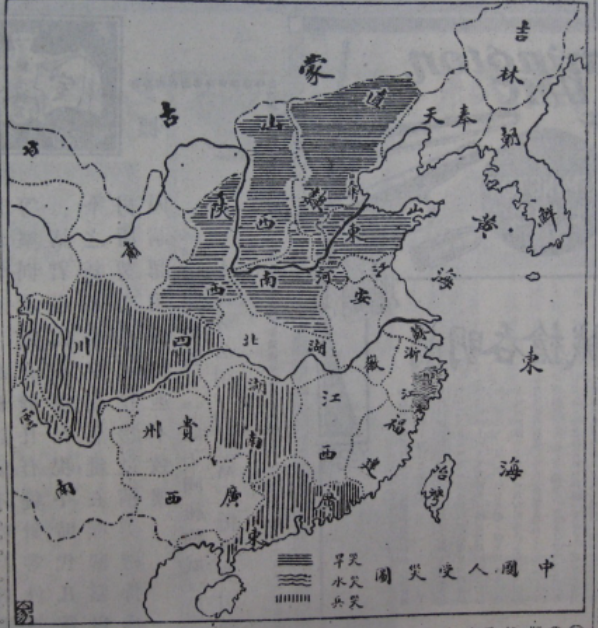
Map of affected areas in the 1920-1921 famine (shaded area at top) with areas of flooding and war-related disaster (at bottom and left).

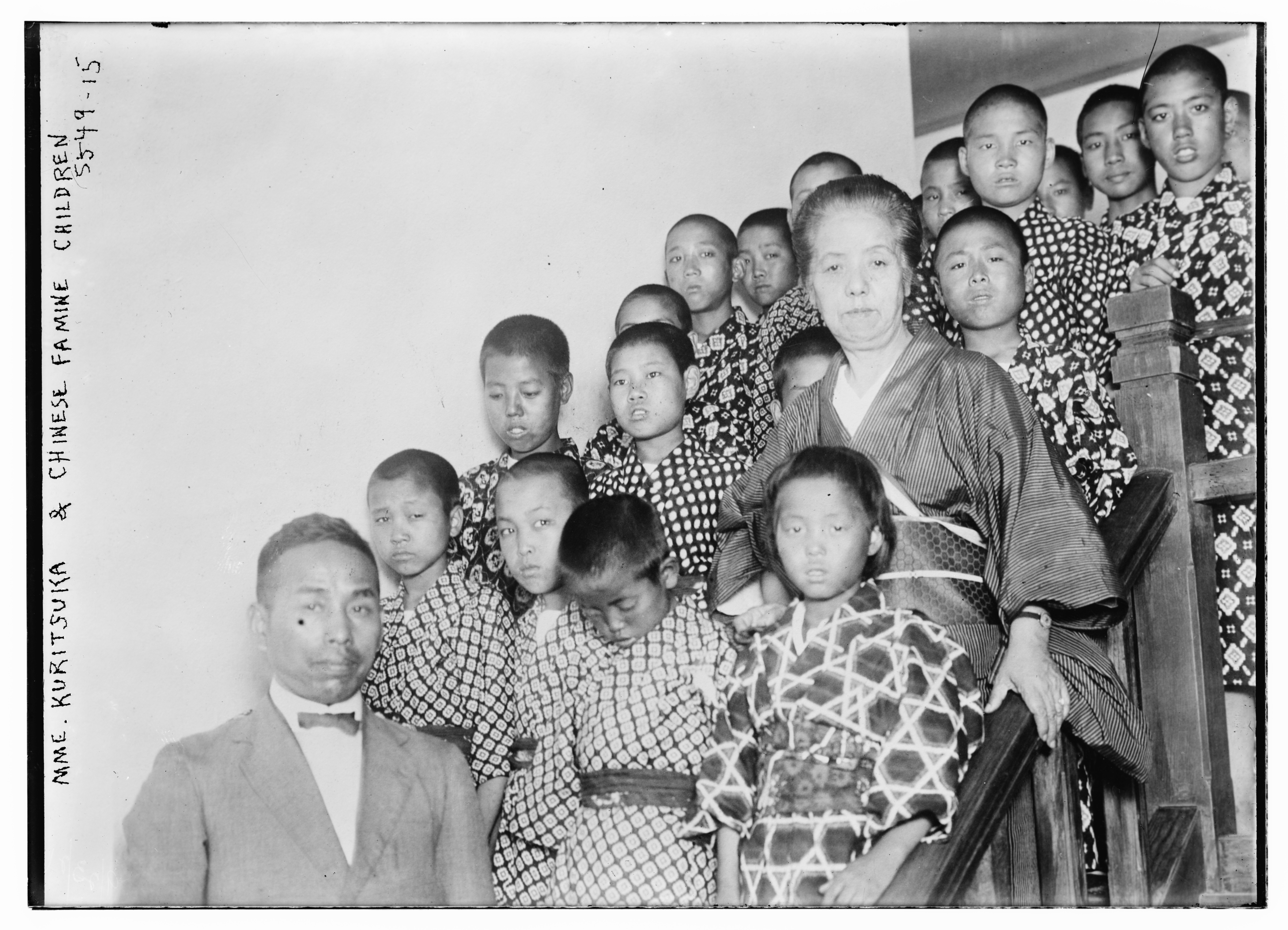
Mme. Kuritsuka & Chinese famine children

The Chinese famine of 1920–1921 affected the Chinese provinces of Zhili, Shandong, Henan, Shanxi and Shaanxi. The famine, caused by poverty and drought, was worsened by the lack of central authority in the power vacuum of the Warlord Era.

== Local responses and relief ==
An estimated 30 million people in more than 200 counties were directly affected by the famine, which resulted in the deaths of half a million people over roughly a nine-month period. Starting with the appearance of famine conditions towards the end of summer 1920, local relief methods were put in place over autumn across the disaster zone: this ranged from the sale of discounted grain by local governments (to force down prices and make food cheaper) to soup kitchens and distribution of cash and grain by village committees, wealthy households and charities arriving from the cities. Many families left the drought areas by foot or train for unaffected regions, such as Inner Mongolia, Manchuria and the Yangzi river valley. The response to the famine saw a surprising level of cooperation between the opposing warlord cliques in the transfer of relief goods and refugees between famine stricken areas and regions not affected by the famine, where many were settled.

== International famine relief ==
Starting in early 1921, the participation of international famine relief organizations aided in lowering levels of starvation, significantly decreasing the mortality rate in afflicted areas, but also overshadowing the relief activity performed locally by Chinese society and various levels of the Chinese government. The overall response to the 1920-21 famine was in stark contrast to the ineffective famine relief in the later 1928-1930 famine, which was in part the result of widespread civil war as the Nationalist Party established control over the country.
