= The Pilbarra Goldfield News =

Newspaper published in Marble Bar, then Port Hedland in Western Australia

The Pilbarra (Note: The spelling reflects that of the region name at the time.) Goldfield News was an Australian newspaper published from 19 February 1897 to 20 March 1923, first in Marble Bar and then, from 1912, in Port Hedland, and is considered one of the earliest publications from the Pilbara. The goldfield located in the Pilbara region was separated into two parts as early as 1896, included mining in Marble Bar, Nullagine, Yandacoogina, and other localities near Marble Bar and Nullagine.

It was regularly quoted by Perth based newspapers such as the Daily News for information about Pilbara matters, as well as commenting and lobbying for the eventual Port Hedland - Marble Bay railway.

== Publication details ==
Marble Bar, W.A. : Ernest A. Williams, 1897-[1923]

Vol. 1, no. 1 (Feb. 19, 1897)- From Aug. 6, 1912 published at Port Hedland, Western Australia

Ceased publication on 20 March 1923.
