= Continental Rifts =

2009 contemporary art show

Continental Rifts: Contemporary Time-based Works of Africa was a contemporary art show at UCLA's Fowler Museum held February through June 2009.

== Bibliography ==
- Aronowicz, Miriam (2009). "Review of Continental Rifts: Contemporary Time-Based Works of Africa". African Arts. 42 (4): 82–83. doi:10.1162/afar.2009.42.4.82. ISSN 0001-9933. JSTOR 20627030. S2CID 67822276.
- Buckner, Clark (2009). "Continental Rifts: Contemporary Time-Based Works of Africa (review)". Nka: Journal of Contemporary African Art. 25 (1): 163–165. doi:10.1215/10757163-2009-25-163. ISSN 2152-7792. S2CID 190713704 – via Project MUSE.
- Daigle, Claire (2009). "Review of Continental Rifts: Contemporary Time-Based Works of Africa". X-TRA. Vol. 12, no. 1.
- Knight, Christopher (May 11, 2009). "Art review: 'Continental Rifts' at UCLA Fowler Museum". Los Angeles Times.
- Sharma, Aparna (2010). "Review of Continental Rifts: Contemporary Time-Based Works of Africa". Leonardo. 43 (1): 71–72. doi:10.1162/leon.2010.43.1.71. ISSN 0024-094X. JSTOR 40540097. S2CID 193246814.
