= Chinese famine of 1928–1930 =

Famine in the Republic of China

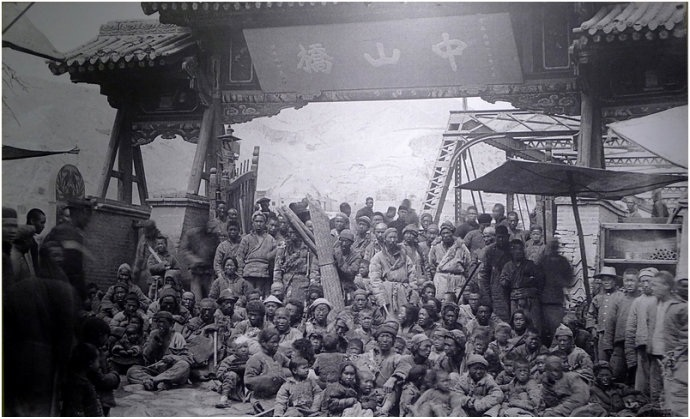
- Famine victims at Zhongshan bridge in Lanzhou
- Country: Republic of China
- Location: Northern and Northwestern China
- Period: 1928–1930
- Total deaths: 6–10 million
- Causes: Severe drought, crop failures, war and inadequate famine relief

The Chinese famine of 1928–1930 occurred as widespread drought hit Northwestern and Northern China, most notably in the provinces of Henan, Shaanxi and Gansu. Mortality is estimated to be within 6 million, including deaths from famine-related diseases. The inefficiency of relief has been pointed out as a factor that aggravated the famine.

== Historical background ==
From 1928 to 1930, China was under the control of Chiang's Nanjing Nationalist government.

The Nanjing Nationalist government was established in April 1927, a year after the Northern Expedition war ended. This war ended the power of imperialism in China and it was a war in which the Chinese Communist Party (CCP) collaborated with the Chinese Nationalist Party (CNP). After the Northern Expedition ended, Chiang, as the leader of the CNP, breached the collaboration between the two parties and began to arrest and murder the members of the CCP. This event is called the Shanghai massacre, the April 12 Purge or the April 12 Incident. In the same year, the Nanjing Nationalist government was established. The CCP retreated to the countryside and hid, while Chiang kept murdering CCP party members.

When the famine happened, the Nanjing Nationalist government was still busy on fighting the CCP. At the time, the leader of the Northwestern army, Feng Yuxiang, did not agree with Chiang's policies against the CCP, therefore, he was preparing for a war against Chiang's domination. This war came to be known as the Central Plains War.

== Consequence ==
=== Death by famine ===
When famine developed, people began to eat everything they could, including bark, grass roots, tree leaves, bran, mud and animals they fed. Human cannibalism also occurred; people exchanged their young children to eat. Many dead bodies had no feet or arms. People even thought that if they did not eat their own children or parents' bodies, other people would eat their bodies.

Some people died from eating too much mud. The mud that they ate was kaolinite, also called Guanyin mud in Chinese (Chinese:观音土). This kind of mud can give the body a false appearance of being full, yet it cannot be absorbed or digested. After the false appearance of fullness faded, people continued to eat the mud again until eventually, they would die from the inability to excrete the mud from their bodies.

=== Death by violence ===
At the preliminary stage of the famine, the price of crops began to increase. Some food theft occurred. In 1927, some robbing events had been reported and the people who robbed were called "brigands" by the government. Some of them were poor farmers who robbed food from rich landlords; some were beggars; the rest were local armies, and they had guns.

Besides these factors, the Central Plains War was perhaps another reason that caused death.

=== Death by plague ===
Many people also died because of the plague, or because of suicide or starvation, and their dead bodies had not been buried. All dead bodies were thrown into a big hole, human bodies and animal bodies mixed. The reason as to why these bodies could not be buried is because surrounding villages kept throwing bodies into this big hole. In addition, some people would dig the graves, to eat recently dead bodies or to collect money. In ancient Chinese culture, when a person died, their children would also bury something they used with them. Usually, there would be pottery. In rich people's graves there would be gold, silver and jewelry. Some people would dig rich people's graves for these valuables. Bodies that could not be buried and bodies that were dug out produced the plague.

== Death toll ==
Gansu's population in 1922 was 6,403,339, before the famine struck in 1928 its population likely reached 7 million. Of which, an estimate of 2.5-3.0 million of Gansu people died. Shaanxi's population in 1928 was 11,802,446, an estimate of 3 million died. In total 6 million died. Some put the mortality as high as 10 million.

== See also ==
- List of famines in China
