= 1556 Shaanxi earthquake =

Natural disaster in Huaxian, China

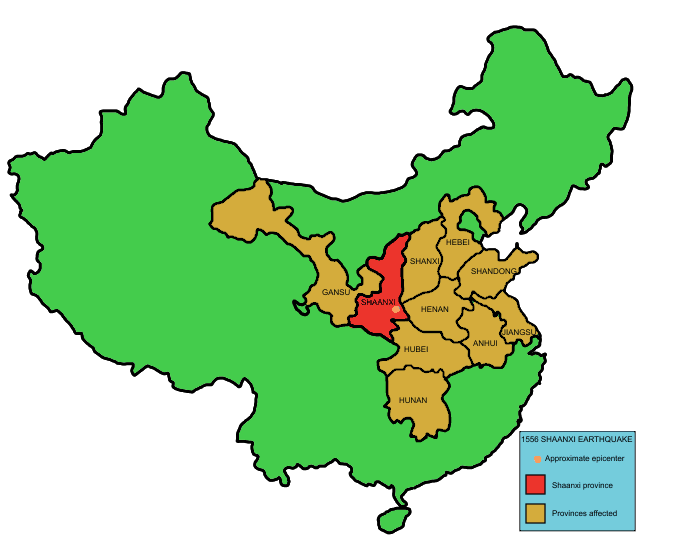
- Map of China showing modern-day Shaanxi province (red) and the other provinces affected by the earthquake (orange)

- Location within China
- Local date: 23 January 1556 in Julian calendar 2 February 1556 in Gregorian calendar The 12th day of the 12th month of the 34th year of the Jiajing era in Chinese calendar
- Local time: Early morning
- Magnitude: 7.0–7.5 M_{w}, 8.0 M_{w}
- Depth: Unknown
- Epicenter: 34°30′N 109°18′E
- Areas affected: Great Ming (present-day China)
- Max. intensity: MMI XI (Extreme)
- Casualties: 100,000+ (direct deaths) ~730,000 (indirect deaths)

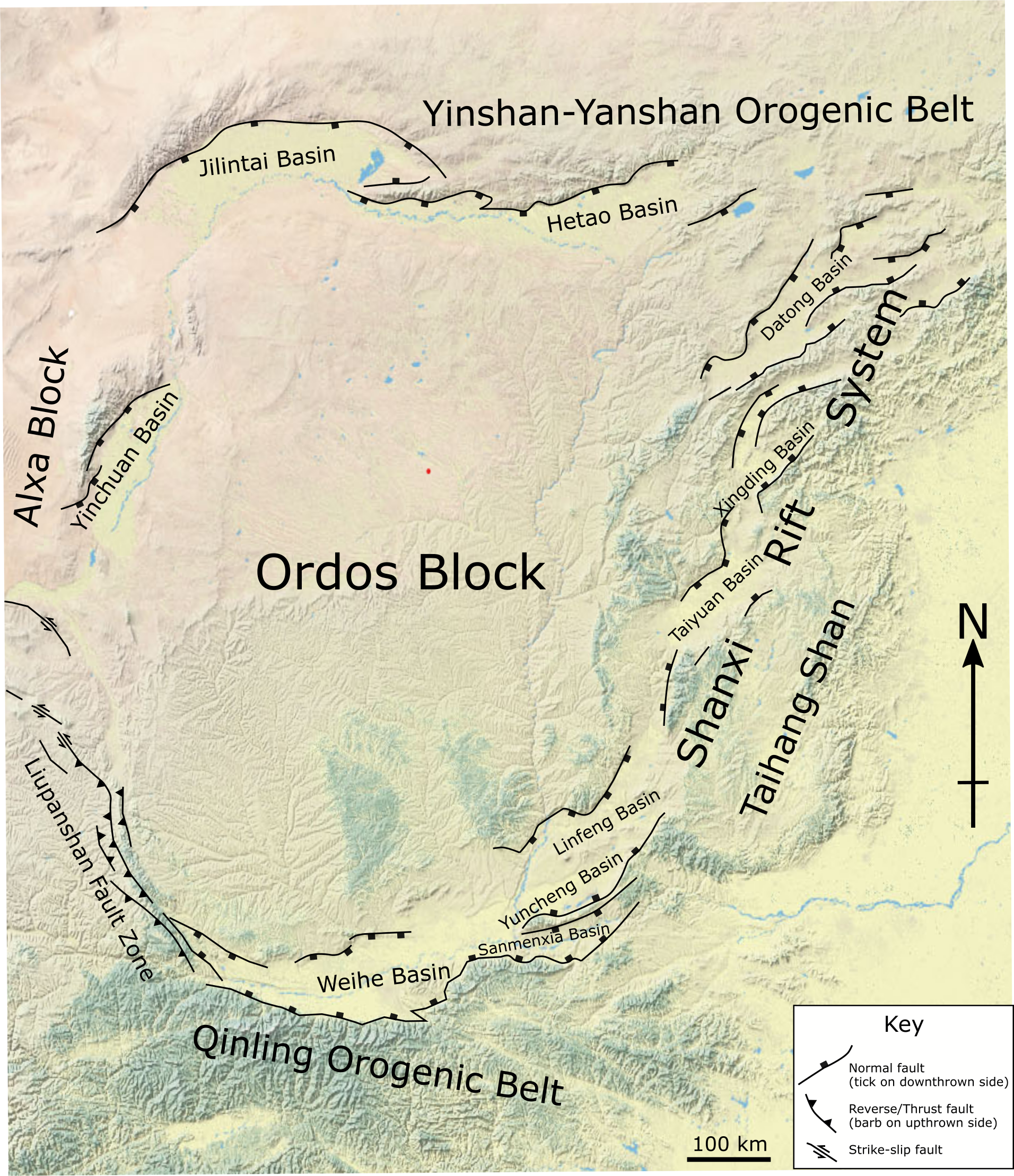
Map of the Weihe–Shanxi Rift System along the southern and eastern margin of the Ordos Block

One of the deadliest earthquakes in history occurred in the early morning of 23 January 1556 in Huaxian, Shaanxi, during the Ming dynasty.

Most of the residents there lived in yaodongs—artificial caves in loess cliffs—which collapsed and buried alive those sleeping inside. Modern estimates by China Earthquake Administration's publications put the direct deaths from the earthquake at roughly 100,000, while over 700,000 either migrated away or died from famine and plagues, which summed up to a total reduction of 830,000 people in imperial hukou registration.

== Tectonic setting ==
Huaxian lies within the Weihe Basin, one of the rift basins that form the southern and eastern boundaries of the Ordos Block. To the east the basin is continuous with the Shanxi Rift System. The Weihe basin formed during the Paleogene in response to northwest–southeast directed extension. Following a tectonically quiet period during the late Paleogene the rift basins became active again in the Neogene in response to NNW–SSE directed extension, activity that continues to the present. The basins in the Weihe-Shanxi Rift System are bounded by large normal faults, which have been responsible for large historical earthquakes. The Weihe Basin has an overall half-graben geometry, with the main controlling faults, such as the Huashan Fault and North Qinling Fault, forming the southern boundary.

== Earthquake ==
The earthquake's epicenter was in the Wei River Valley in Shaanxi Province, near Huaxian (now Huazhou District of Weinan), Weinan and Huayin. Huaxian was completely destroyed, killing more than half the residents of the city, with an estimated death toll in the hundreds of thousands. The situation in Weinan and Huayin was similar. In certain areas, 20-metre-deep (66 ft) crevices opened in the earth. Destruction and death were widespread, affecting places as far as 500 kilometres (310 mi) from the epicenter. The earthquake also triggered landslides, which contributed to the massive death toll. The rupture occurred during the reign of the Jiajing Emperor of the Ming dynasty. Therefore, in the Chinese historical record, this earthquake is often referred to as the Jiajing Great Earthquake.

In the annals of China it was described in this manner:

In the winter of 1556, an earthquake catastrophe occurred in the Shaanxi and Shanxi Provinces. In our Hua County, various misfortunes took place. Mountains and rivers changed places and roads were destroyed. In some places, the ground suddenly rose up and formed new hills, or it sank abruptly and became new valleys. In other areas, a stream burst out in an instant, or the ground broke and new gullies appeared. Huts, official houses, temples and city walls collapsed all of a sudden.

The earthquake damaged many of the Forest of Stone steles badly. Of the 114 Kaicheng Stone Classics, 40 were broken in the earthquake.

The scholar Qin Keda lived through the earthquake and recorded details. One conclusion he drew was that "at the very beginning of an earthquake, people indoors should not go out immediately. Just crouch down and wait. Even if the nest has collapsed, some eggs may remain intact." The shaking reduced the height of the Small Wild Goose Pagoda in Xi'an by three levels.

== Geology ==
Modern estimates, based on geological data, give the earthquake a magnitude of approximately M_{w}8.0 on the moment magnitude scale and XI (catastrophic damage) on the Mercalli scale, though more recent discoveries have shown that it was more likely M_{w}7.9. Following the earthquake, aftershocks continued several times a month for half a year.

Shaking was felt strongly across the Weihe Basin region. The maximum China seismic intensity was XI to XII occurring in Huaxian and Weinan. This would support the theory of the earthquake rupturing along the Huashan and Weinan faults. Intensity VIII was observed throughout the basin and the intensity X+ zone was 100 km (62 mi) long.

Studies about the earthquake published between 1998 and 2017 presumed scarps along the Huashan and Weinan faults, some higher than 8 m (26 ft), were produced by the 1556 earthquake. The fault zone is located northeast of Xi'an. This normal fault generally trends east–west and dips to the north. A 1995 study said scarps along the Huashan Fault were 3–8 m (9.8–26.2 ft) high. Near the town of Huashan, the fault terrace contained Yangshao culture artifacts which were 4,000 years old. In a separate 1998 study, the fault scarps were about 4–7 m (13–23 ft) high. Scarps of the Weinan Fault are less detailed in published works with most focused around the Chishui River area. Two studies in 1992 and 2010 estimated the fault scarps at 2–4 m (6 ft 7 in – 13 ft 1 in) and 7–8 m (23–26 ft) respectively. There has not been any research to confirm these scarps were produced by the earthquake or formed by multiple events. Assuming both faults ruptured during the earthquake, which runs for a total 90 km (56 mi), the M_{w} would be 7.0–7.5, according to empirical scaling relationships between magnitude and fault rupture length. This suggests previous values for the earthquake's magnitude were overestimated.

== Affected area ==
More than 97 counties in the provinces of Shaanxi, Shanxi, Henan, Gansu, Hebei, Shandong, Hubei, Hunan, Jiangsu and Anhui were affected. Buildings were damaged slightly in the cities of Beijing, Chengdu and Shanghai. In some counties as much as 60% of the population was killed.

== Death toll ==
Modern estimates by China Earthquake Administration's publications put the direct deaths from the earthquake to be roughly 100,000, while 730,000 either migrated away or died from famine and plagues, which summed up to a total reduction of 830,000 people in Imperial hukou registration.

As the CEA did not estimate the total deaths (including subsequent famine and plagues), a handful of CEA staff scientists gave their own estimates, such as 450,000 or 530,000.

Millions of people at the time lived in yaodongs—artificial loess caves—on high cliffs in the Loess Plateau. Much of the population in some of the affected areas lived in yaodongs. This was a major contributing factor to the very high death toll. The earthquake collapsed many caves and caused landslides which destroyed many more.

== Foreign reaction ==
The Portuguese Dominican friar Gaspar da Cruz, who visited Guangzhou later in 1556, heard about the earthquake, and later reported about it in the last chapter of his book A Treatise of China (1569). He viewed the earthquake as a possible punishment for people's sins, and the Great Comet of 1556 as, possibly, the sign of this calamity (as well as perhaps the sign of the birth of the Antichrist).

== See also ==
- List of earthquakes in China
- List of disasters in China by death toll
- List of historical earthquakes
