= Ordos Block =

Geologic feature in China

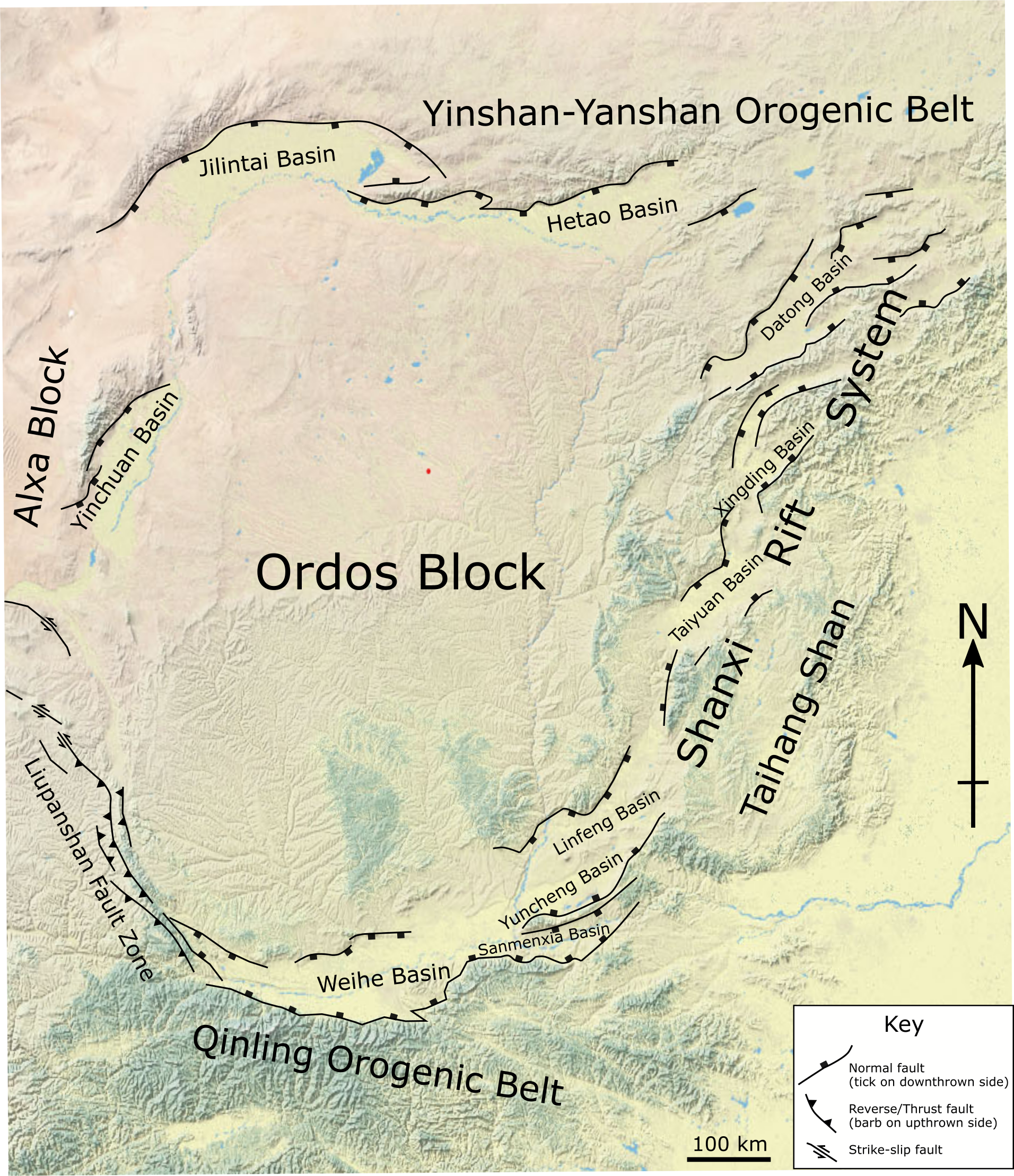
Map of the Ordos Block showing the active fault systems that form its boundaries

The Ordos Block is a crustal block, that forms part of the larger North China Block (NCB). It is surrounded by active fault systems and has been a distinct block since at least the Mesozoic. It is bordered to the west by the Alxa Block, the westernmost part of the NCB, to the south by the Qinling orogenic belt, to the north by the Yanshan-Yinshan orogenic belt, part of the Central Asian Orogenic Belt and to the east by the Taihang Mountains, which form part of the Trans-North China Orogen. The block is currently stable and large earthquakes are restricted to the bordering fault zones. It has been suggested that the block is currently undergoing anti-clockwise rotation with respect to the Eurasian Plate, as a result of the ongoing eastward spreading of the Tibetan Plateau, although this view has been challenged.

== Extent ==
The Ordos Block is a roughly rectangular fault-bounded part of the larger North China Block, which itself closely matches the extent of the Paleoproterozoic North China Craton. It covers an area of about 250,000 km^{2} and has a thick lithosphere of more than 200 km, suggesting that, unlike other parts of the NCB, it retains a fully cratonic character.

== Geology ==
The shallow geology of Ordos Block consists of a thick sequence of Phanerozoic sedimentary rocks in what is known as the Ordos Basin. There are three main sequences, of Lower Paleozoic, Upper Paleozoic and Mesozoic age. The Lower Paleozoic sequence consists of mainly carbonate rocks ranging from middle Cambrian to lower Ordovician in age. Following a regional unconformity associated with the Caledonian orogeny, sedimentation resumed during the Carboniferous and continued through the Permian with a sequence of clastic sedimentary rocks, including significant thicknesses of coal. The overlying Mesozoic sequence consist of mainly fluvial and lacustrine deposits. The youngest unit preserved in the basin is of Lower Cretaceous age, with any younger parts of the sequence having been eroded following uplift during the Neogene. This erosion surface is covered in the southern part of the block by Upper Neogene to Quaternary deposits of red clay and loess, part of the Loess Plateau.

The understanding of the deep geology of the Ordos Block is based on the interpretation of gravity and magnetic data, backed up by a limited amount of deep borehole samples, yielding geochronological and isotope data. On the basis of this dataset, the block appears to be divided into a northern and southern part with contrasting histories. They are juxtaposed across the northwest–southeast trending Datong-Huachi fault. The northern part consists mainly of partly migmatised metasedimentary rocks with granitic gneisses. They are partly of Neoarchean age, with reworking at several periods during the Paleoproterozoic. The southern part is thought be of Paleoarchean to Mesoarchean in age, with some Neoarchean additions.

== Margins ==
All the margins of the Ordos Block are tectonically active. The style of tectonics varies around the block, with reverse faulting at its southwestern corner along the Liupanshan Fault. Rifting to the northwest and north on the Yinchuan, Jilantai and Hetao Basins and rifting within a zone of distributed right lateral strike-slip along its eastern and southern margin, forming the Weihe-Shanxi Rift System.

=== Liupanshan Fault ===
This belt of NNW–SSE trending thrusting and reverse faulting runs for about 180 km and forms the southwestern margin of the Ordos Block. This thrust belt began to form during the Pliocene. The zone accommodates shortening associated with the eastward motion of the Tibetan Plateau at a rate of about 6 mm per year, although GPS data suggest that current motion across the thrust zone is only about a half of that. There is also a smaller component of right lateral shear along the zone.

=== Yinchuan Basin ===
This ~160 km long SSW–NNE trending rift basin has a half-graben geometry. It has been active since at least the middle Oligocene and contains a thick sedimentary fill (>8 km). It has had a long tectonic history, starting with a phase of northwest–southeast directed extension from the Oligocene to the middle Miocene. This was followed by a short period of inversion related to NW–SE compression during the early part of the late Miocene, before a return to NW–SE extension for the rest of the Late Miocene into the Pliocene. From the Late Pleistocene to the present day, the basin has been in an overall transtensional regime affected by a combination of NE–SW compression and NW–SE extension. A right lateral slip-rate of about 2 mm per year has been estimated across the basin, with about 1 mm per year of extension.

=== Jilintai Basin ===
The Jilintai Basin is arcuate in shape, following the main bounding fault zone to the north, consisting of the Langshan Piedmont and Seertengshan faults. It has an overall half-graben geometry. It has a similar tectonic history to the neighbouring Yinchuan Basin. A right lateral slip-rate of about 0.8 mm per year has been estimated, with about 1.6 mm per year of extension.

=== Hetao Basin ===
This basin trends WSW–ENE and also has a half-graben geometry. The main bounding fault zone lies to the north of the basin and consists of the Wulashan, Daqingshan and Helinggeer faults. It shares the early history of the Yinchuan and Jilintai basins, but the recent tectonics in this case appear to be approximately north–south extension. Estimated slip-rates are low, with high uncertainties, with small amounts of left-lateral strike-slip combined with a small component of either extension or shortening.

=== Shanxi Rift System ===
This group of rift basins forms the SSW–NNE trending eastern margin of the Ordos Block, over a distance of >900 km. The individual basins and their bounding high-angle normal faults have a WSW–ENE to SW–NE trend. They have an overall en echelon geometry, consistent with right lateral sense of displacement over the zone. The age of the 2.0–3.8 km thick sedimentary sequences in the basins indicates that they became active during the Miocene to Pliocene. GPS-derived slip rates on the various basins in the rift system show consistent small amounts of right lateral strike-slip combined with generally smaller amounts of extension.

=== Weihe Basin ===
The Weihe Basin forms the southern margin of the Ordos Block. It is regarded as part of the Shanxi Rift System by some geologists and as a distinct rift element by others.

The basin which has a sedimentary fill of 4 km to 6 km in thickness, consists of several sub-basins with a half-graben geometry, controlled by major normal faults. The basins started to form in the Eocene as a result of NW–SE extension. After a brief period of NE–SW extension in the Pleistocene, the current tectonic setting began, which consists of NNW–SSE extension. This ongoing extension has been responsible for large historical damaging earthquakes, such as those in 1556 and 1815. GPS data are unable to constrain the current displacement rates.

== Current tectonics ==
The block remains a stable piece of cratonic continental lithosphere. However, it has been suggested that is currently rotating anticlockwise due to interactions with neighbouring blocks, particularly the continuing eastward spread of the Tibetan Plateau. This rotational model predicts the presence of right lateral shear along all of the block boundaries. GPS data have been interpreted to support this model. In another model, there is no rotation of the Ordos Block and right lateral shear only on the western and eastern boundaries and left lateral shear on the northern and southern boundaries. GPS data have also been interpreted to support the non-rotational model.
