= 2018 Attica wildfires =

Series of wildfires in Greece

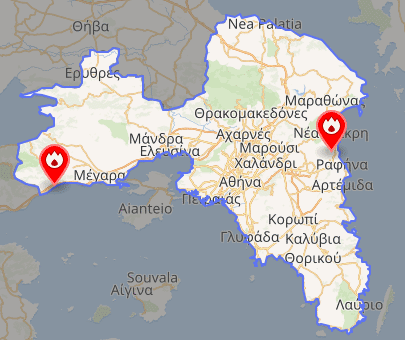
- The two main fire fronts in Attica on 23 July 2018
- Date: 23 July 2018 – 26 July 2018
- Location: Attica
- Coordinates: 38°03′09″N 23°52′06″E

Impacts
- Deaths: 104
- Injuries: 172
- Structures lost: more than 4,000 (destroyed or damaged)

Ignition
- Cause: Human negligence

Map
- Location within Greece

A series of wildfires in Greece, during the 2018 European heat wave, began in the coastal areas of Attica in July 2018. 104 people were confirmed dead from the Mati fires. The fires were, at that time, the second-deadliest wildfire event in the 21st century, after the 2009 Black Saturday bushfires in Australia that killed 173.

Over 700 residents were evacuated or rescued, mainly from the seaside settlements located north of the port town of Rafina, namely Kokkino Limanaki and Mati, where rescuers found 26 corpses trapped just meters away from the sea, apparently hugging each other as they died. Boats also recovered corpses from the water, and rescued hundreds of people from beaches and the sea. Two people drowned when the boat rescuing them from a hotel in Mati capsized. Μore than 4,000 residents were affected by the wildfires. The Greek prime minister Alexis Tsipras declared a state of emergency in Attica, and announced a three-day period of national mourning, stating in a televised address, "The country is going through an unspeakable tragedy".

After the fires, flags atop the Acropolis and the Greek parliament flew at half mast. The European flags at the European Commission headquarters in Brussels also flew at half mast in honour of the victims. Many countries worldwide helped or offered aid to Greece. A 65-year-old man from Penteli has been arrested for causing the fire through negligence, by burning wood in his garden.

== Fires ==
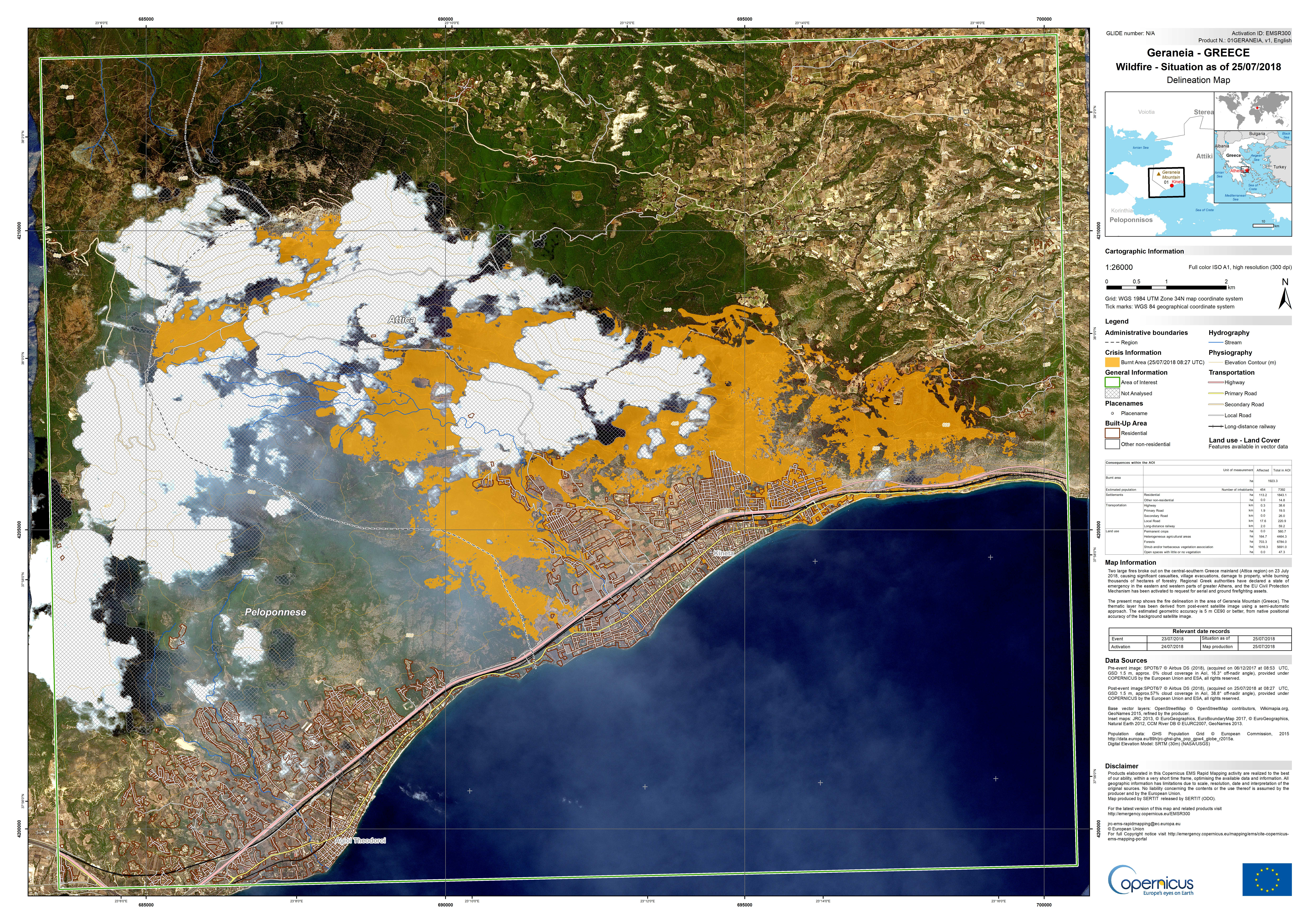
The fire in Kineta and its aftermath

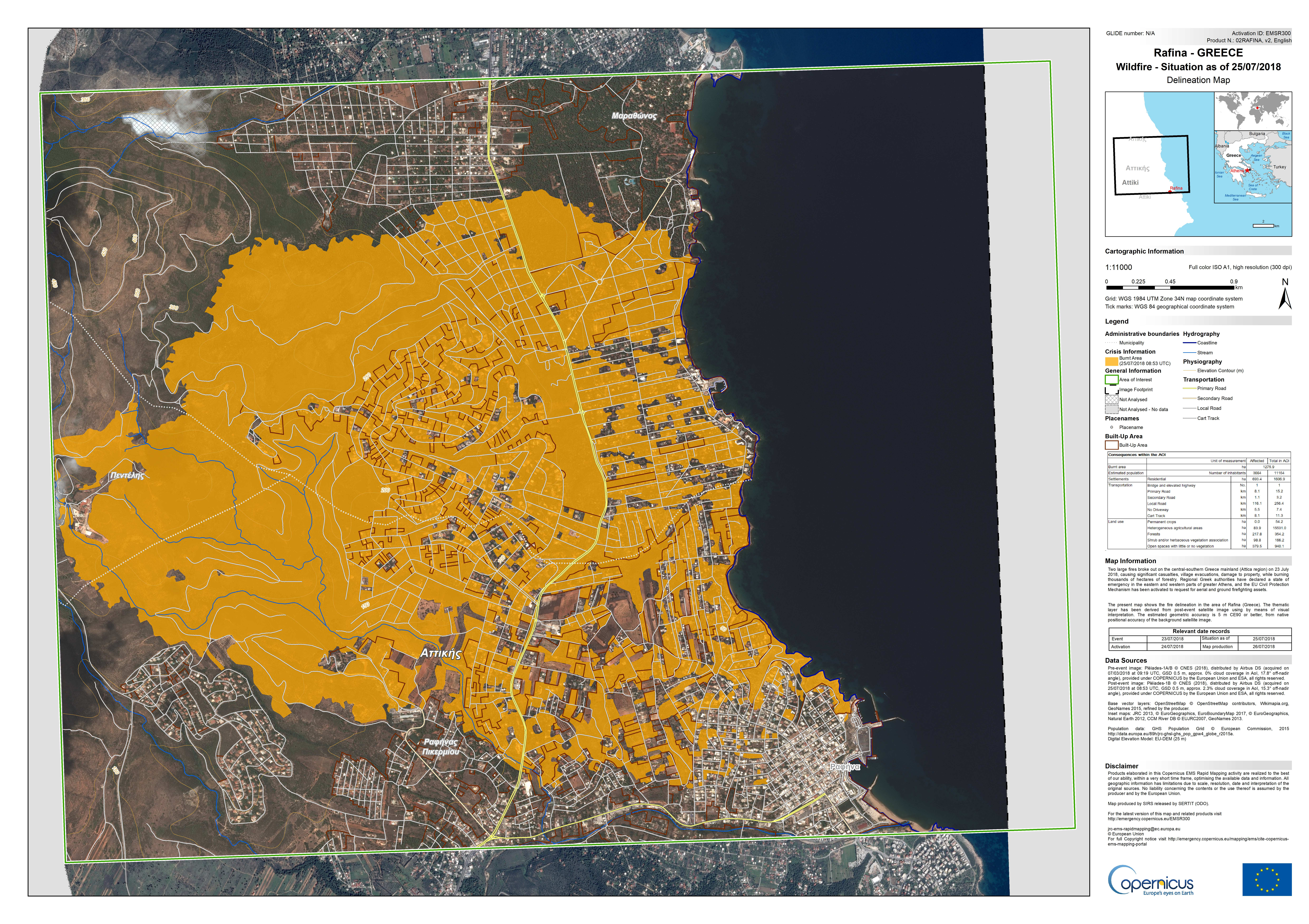
The fire in Mati and its aftermath

On 23 July 2018 at 13:00 Eastern European Time, a wildfire started west of Athens near Kineta. A few hours later, a second wildfire started burning at the north of Athens near Penteli. Due to very strong wind gusts in both areas, up to a maximum of 124 km/h, 77 mph, 12 Beaufort, both wildfires spread very quickly. The fire in Kineta burned houses in the area, while the fire in Penteli headed east towards the beach, where it started burning parts of Neos Voutzas, Mati and Kokkino Limanaki just north of the town of Rafina and as far as its northern fringes.

=== Impact ===
The flames were so intense that they trapped and burned people inside their houses, cars, or a few meters away from the beach. Thousands of vehicles and houses were destroyed before the fire was brought under control hours later. An entire summer camp with 620 children was evacuated in an overnight operation. Many animals, wild and domestic, died or were injured.

At the time, the fires were the second-deadliest wildfire event to have occurred worldwide since 2001, after the 2009 Black Saturday bushfires in Australia that killed 173. In addition, the wildfires were also the sixth-deadliest to have occurred in the one-hundred years prior to the event. Only the Black Saturday bushfires of 2009, the Black Dragon Fire of 1987, the Indonesian forest fires of 1997, the Cloquet Fire of 1918, and the Kursha-2 Fire of 1936 had a higher death toll.

== Casualties and damage ==
As of October 2022, 104 people were confirmed dead; the dead were identified as 50 women, 43 men, and 11 children (one infant). The youngest was 6 months and the oldest 93 years old. The dead were 98 Greek, two Polish, one Irish, one Belgian, one Georgian nationals and one unidentified. The last victim died in October 2022, from health problems due to the fire. At least 164 adults and 23 children were taken to hospital with injuries, including 11 adults in serious condition. It was also reported that at least 15 of the injured later died in the hospital. Actress and radio presenter Chrysa Spiliotis and her husband were among the deaths.

Thousands of vehicles, 4,000 homes, and 40,000 pine and olive trees were burned; the fire destroyed Mati and nearby Kokkino Limanaki. About 400 people waded deep into the sea and waited hours to be rescued. Temperatures reached 800 °C, fanned by gale-force winds.

== Cause ==
On 26 July 2018, the Mayor of Penteli, Dimitris Stergiou, claimed that the deadly fire that hit Mati in eastern Attica began from a damaged cable at a utility pole. In a press conference held on 26 July, Nikos Toskas, the Alternate Minister of Public Order and Citizen Protection, said that there are strong indications of arson, for the fires both in Kineta and Penteli. The defence minister Panos Kammenos said illegal constructions had exacerbated the situation.

The arson investigation department of the Hellenic Fire Service dismissed the arson theory on 27 July, stating the fire was probably started due to wood being burnt in Daou, Penteli. Kathimerini said the suspect's name was already known. A video obtained from a home security camera by the newspaper, showed that a fire started in a clearing near houses in Daou at 4:41 p.m. and quickly spread due to the wind.

A 65-year old resident of the area was charged with multiple manslaughter, causing criminal harm through negligence and negligent arson. He is suspected of causing the fire after burning wood in his garden.

== Reconstruction plans ==
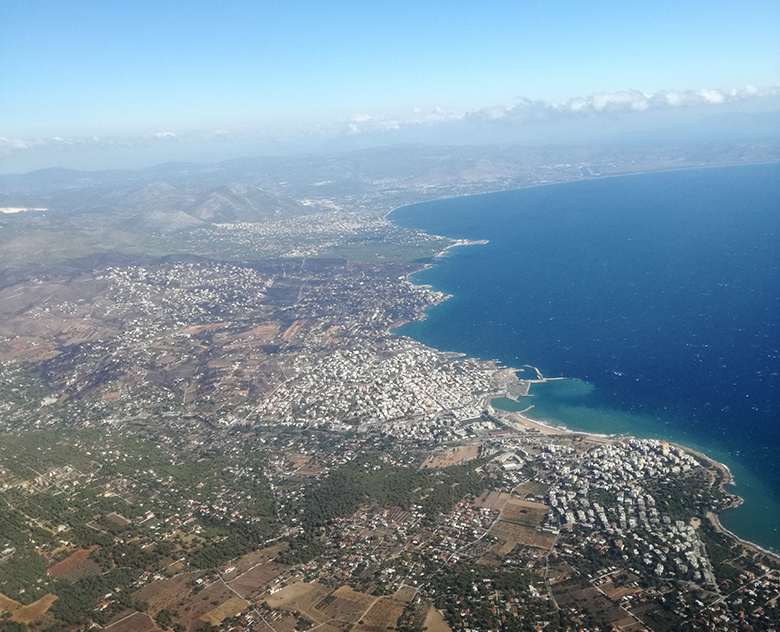
Rafina, Mati and Neos Voutzas in August 2018

The Mayor of Athens Giorgios Kaminis was in constant communication with the local authorities of the municipalities affected by the wildfires. The City of Athens commissioned a study to research and proposed an actionable and resilient reforestation plan, as well as collect funding through the Athens Partnership for those impacted.

During reconstruction and rescue around the wildfires Greek citizens, businesses and organizations banded together to aid one another. Businesses handed out free food and water to victims and first responders, organizations such as the Hellenic Center for Disease Prevention and Control launched donation drives, and citizens opened their homes for those impacted, both independently and through Airbnb.

== Aftermath ==
In March 2019 a report was produced detailing many mistakes made by the authorities: mismanagement by police and fire services, and a lack of coordination between rescue agencies, had caused "chaos and a collapse of the system... criminal mistakes and omissions". During the wildfire of Mati, several prominent Greek news outlets did not cover the incident as an environmental issue, but rather a political event.

The Prime Minister visited Mati weeks after the fire, and promised to create a "model town" within a year. However, after a year, the town was not yet rebuilt and the land remained scorched. Home owners had by then received compensation of up to €6,000, but there were significant difficulties in getting permission to carry out repair work. Several residents started private court cases against the government.

In August 2021 similar wildfires struck large parts of Greece and Turkey, following a period of exceptionally high temperatures of up to 47 °C, albeit a general absence of strong or even medium winds.

In April 2024, a court convicted five former firefighting and disaster response officials, and sentenced them to between 15 and 111 years' imprisonment for multiple counts of criminal negligence resulting in injury and death from the fires. However, the court also allowed the sentences to be served concurrently and set the maximum amount of servable time to five years, and also allowed the defendants to pay a fine in lieu of actual imprisonment before being released. The owner of the property where the fire began was also sentenced to three years' imprisonment, but was released after he was also allowed to pay a fine instead. Fifteen other officials were also cleared of charges relating to the disaster.

=== International assistance ===
Greece appealed for help from other countries to help tackle the fires and deal with the emergency situation by submitting a request through the European Union Civil Protection Mechanism for international assistance with air and land assets. European Commissioner for Humanitarian Aid and Crisis Management arrived in Athens on 24 July to coordinate the EU assistance being provided to Greece through the EU Civil Protection Mechanism. The EU Civil Protection Mechanism, helped mobilize planes, vehicles, medical personnel and firefighters from the EU countries. The EU's Copernicus satellite system has also been activated to provide the authorities with highly specialized maps. The Greek minister Nikos Toskas said never before have there been so many offers to assist firefighting efforts, lauding the solidarity other countries have shown.

The following countries responded:

- Albania – €100,000 in financial aid to deal with the emergency situation.
- Australia – Offered assistance if needed.
- Austria
- Armenia – Offered assistance if needed.
- Bulgaria
- Canada
- Croatia – Two Canadair CL-415 water-tanker planes.
- Cyprus – Fire engines, personnel and €10,000,000 in financial aid.
- Czech Republic
- France
- Georgia
- Israel
- Italy – Two Canadair CL-415 water-tanker planes.
- Germany
- Hungary
- Republic of North Macedonia – 6,000,000 denars (about €100,000) in financial aid in dealing with the emergency situation.
- Malta
- Montenegro
- Poland – Two teams of the State Fire Service were provided to support the rescue and fire-fighting operation.
- Portugal – Portugal has offered the assistance of 50 firefighters, in the scope of the EU Civil Protection Mechanism.
- Romania – A C-27 J Spartan airplane configured for firefighting and a C-130 Hercules aircraft for logistic support, as well as a total of 20 soldiers.
- Russia
- Serbia
- Spain – Two Canadair CL-415 water-tanker planes.
- Switzerland
- Turkey
- United States – Surveillance of the wildfires with drones, to help spot and fight fires more quickly.

== See also ==
- 2007 Greek forest fires
- 2009 Greek forest fires
- 2012 Chios Forest Fire
