= Deadly earthquakes =

Deadly earthquakes may refer to:

- List of deadly earthquakes since 1900
- List of natural disasters by death toll#Earthquakes
- Lists of earthquakes#Deadliest earthquakes (by year)
