= 1887 Yellow River flood =

Flood of the Yellow River in China

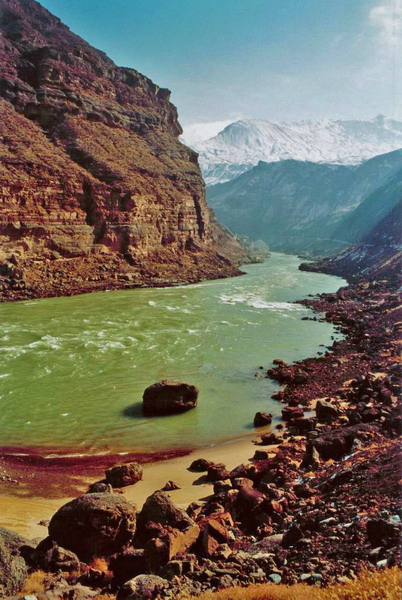

The 1887 Yellow River flood in the Qing Dynasty was a flood in China that began in late September 1887 and killed at least 930,000 people. It was the single deadliest flood in Chinese history, as well as one of the largest natural disasters by death toll in recorded history. (Note: The 1931 China floods are a competing event for both records, although the highest estimates are both widely disputed and use loose definitions of attributable deaths.)

== History ==
For many centuries, farmers living near the Yellow River, China had built dikes to contain the river which flowed higher over time because of silt deposition on the riverbed. In 1887, this rising river, swollen by days of heavy rain, overcame the dikes on or around September 28, causing a massive flood. Since there is no international unit to measure a flood's strength, it is usually classified by the extent of the damage done, depth of the water, and the number of casualties.

The water of the Yellow River is generally thought to have broken through the dikes in Huayuankou, near the city of Zhengzhou in Henan province. Owing to the low-lying plains near the area, the flood spread very quickly throughout Northern China, covering an estimated 50,000 square miles (130,000 km^{2}), swamping agricultural settlements and commercial centers. After the flood, two million were left homeless. The resulting pandemic and lack of basic essentials claimed as many lives as those lost directly to the flood. It was one of the worst floods in history, though the later 1931 Yangtze-Huai River flood may have killed as many as four million. The highest estimated death toll is 2,000,000. The lowest estimated death toll was 900,000.

== See also ==
- List of disasters in China by death toll
- List of floods in China
- List of natural disasters by death toll
