= Spiliotis =

Spiliotis is a surname. Notable people with the surname include:

- Chrysa Spiliotis
- Joyce Spiliotis
