= List of natural disasters by death toll =

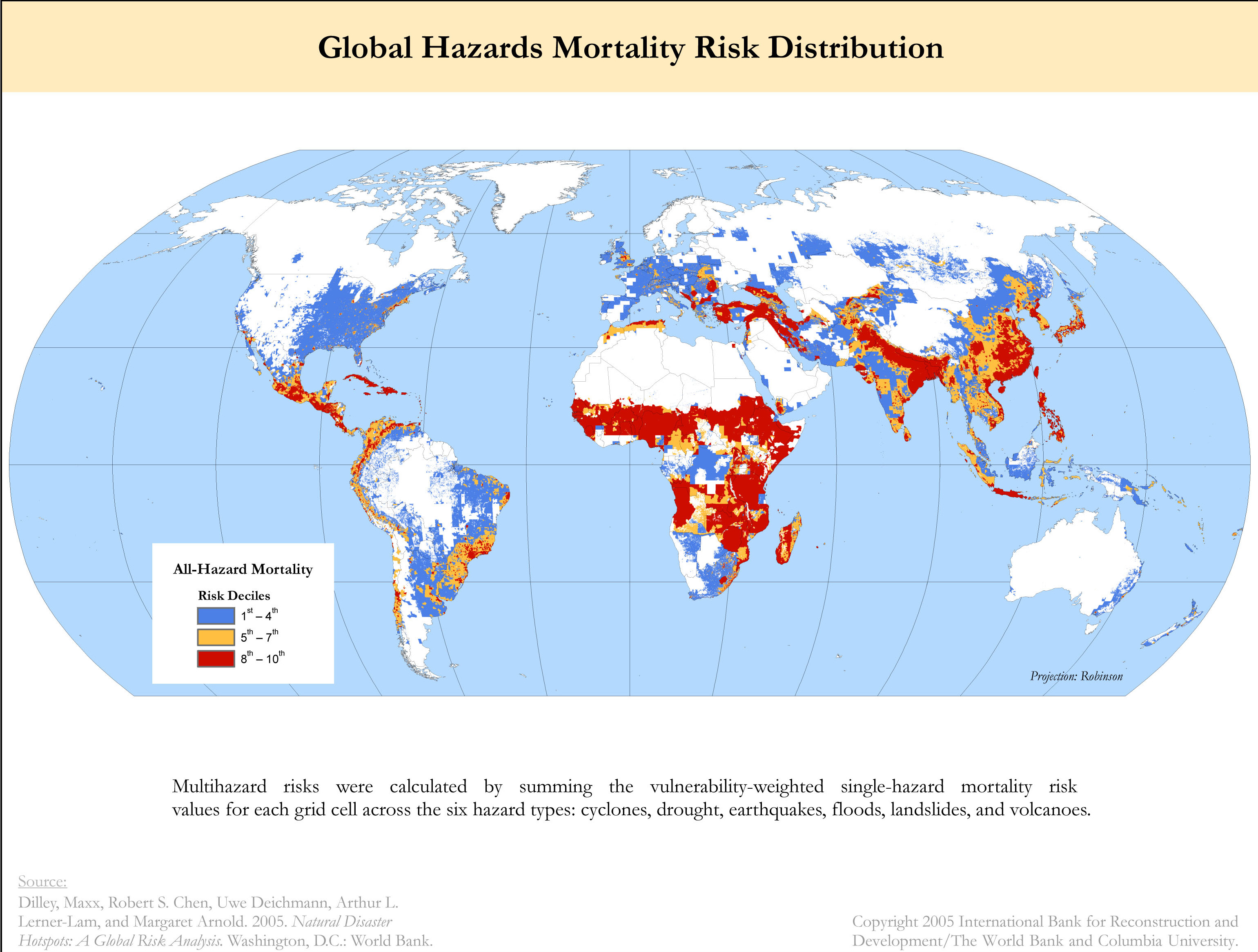
Global multihazard mortality risks and distribution (2005) for cyclones, drought, earthquakes, floods, landslides, and volcanoes (excluding heat waves, snowstorms, and other deadly hazards).

A natural disaster is a sudden event that causes widespread destruction, major collateral damage, or loss of life, brought about by forces other than the acts of human beings. A natural disaster might be caused by earthquakes, flooding, volcanic eruption, landslide, cyclones, etc. To be classified as a disaster, it must have profound environmental effects or loss of life and frequently causes financial loss.

== Ten deadliest natural disasters by highest estimated death toll excluding epidemics and famines ==
This list takes into account only the highest estimated death toll for each and every disaster and lists them accordingly. It does not include epidemics and famines. The list also does not include the 1938 Yellow River flood, which was caused by the deliberate destruction of dikes.

Death toll (Highest estimate)	Event	Location	Date
4,000,000 (Note: The estimate by Nova's sources is close to 5 million and include famine and disease, while another estimate based on contemporary reports places it around 400,000.)	1931 China floods	China	July 1931
2,000,000	1887 Yellow River flood	China	September 1887
500,000	1970 Bhola cyclone	East Pakistan (now Bangladesh)	November 13, 1970
316,000	2010 Haiti earthquake	Haiti	January 12, 2010
300,000+ (Note: In January 1977, Taiwan's Military Intelligence Bureau, unfriendly to the mainland Chinese government, claimed they obtained an internal document dated nine days after the 1976 Tangshan earthquake, that found 655,237 dead. Scholars found 655,237 to be a "suspiciously accurate figure" just 9 days after the earthquake. An internal document dated seven weeks after the earthquake that historians could verify found 263,299 deaths. Modern historians estimated "at least 300,000".)	1976 Tangshan earthquake	Hebei, China	July 28, 1976
300,000	526 Antioch earthquake	Byzantine Empire (present-day Hatay Province, Turkey)	May 526
≈300,000	1839 Coringa cyclone	Andhra Pradesh, India	November 25, 1839
≈300,000	1737 Calcutta cyclone	Mughal Empire (now West Bengal and Bangladesh)	October 1737
273,407	1920 Haiyuan earthquake	Ningxia, China	December 16, 1920
300,000	1139 Ganja earthquake	Seljuk Empire and Kingdom of Georgia (present-day Azerbaijan)	September 30, 1139

== Deadliest natural disasters by year excluding epidemics and famines ==
=== 20th century ===
Year	Deaths	Event	Countries affected	Type	Date
1901	9,500	1901 eastern United States heat wave	United States	Heat wave	June–July
1902	29,000	1902 eruption of Mount Pelée	Martinique	Volcanic eruption	April–August
1903	3,500	1903 Manzikert earthquake	Turkey	Earthquake	April 29
1904	400	1904 Sichuan earthquake	China	Earthquake	August 30
1905	20,000+	1905 Kangra earthquake	India	Earthquake	April 4
1906	15,000	1906 Hong Kong typhoon	Hong Kong	Tropical cyclone	September 18
1907	12,000–15,000	1907 Qaratog earthquake	Uzbekistan	Earthquake	October 21
1908	75,000–82,000	1908 Messina earthquake	Italy	Earthquake	December 28
1909	6,000–8,000	1909 Borujerd earthquake	Iran	Earthquake	January 23
1910	2,450	1910 Costa Rica earthquakes	Costa Rica	Earthquake	May 4
1911	41,072	1911 France heat wave	France	Heat wave	June–August
1912	50,000–220,000	1912 China typhoon	China	Tropical cyclone	August 29
1913	942–1,900	1913 Eshan earthquake	China	Earthquake	December 21
1914	2,344	1914 Burdur earthquake	Turkey	Earthquake	October 4
1915	29,978–32,610	1915 Avezzano earthquake	Italy	Earthquake	January 13
1916	2,000–10,000	White Friday avalanches	Italy	Avalanche	December 13
1917	1,500	1917 Bali earthquake	Indonesia	Earthquake	January 21
1918	1,000	1918 Shantou earthquake	China	Earthquake	February 13
1919	5,000	1919 Kelud mudflow	Indonesia	Volcanic eruption	May 19
1920	258,707–273,407	1920 Haiyuan earthquake	China, Mongolia	Earthquake	December 16
1921	215	September 1921 San Antonio floods	United States	Flood	September 7–11
1922	50,000–100,000+	1922 Shantou typhoon	Philippines, China	Tropical cyclone	July 27 – August 3
1923	105,385–142,800	1923 Great Kantō earthquake	Japan	Earthquake	September 1
1924	1,000	Great flood of 99	India	Flood	July
1925	5,000	1925 Dali earthquake	China	Earthquake	March 16
1926	709	1926 Havana–Bermuda hurricane	Cuba, United States, Bahamas, Bermuda	Tropical cyclone	October 14–28
1927	40,912	1927 Gulang earthquake	China, Tibet	Earthquake	May 22
1928	4,112+	1928 Okeechobee hurricane	United States, Puerto Rico, Guadeloupe, Bahamas, Dominica,	Tropical cyclone	September 12–21
1929	3,257–3,800	1929 Kopet Dag earthquake	Iran, Turkmenistan	Earthquake	May 1
1930	2,000–8,000	1930 San Zenón hurricane	Dominican Republic	Tropical cyclone	September 3
1931	422,499–4,000,000	1931 China floods	China	Flood	July–November
1932	3,103+	1932 Cuba hurricane	Cayman Islands, Cuba	Tropical cyclone	November 9
1933	6,865–9,300	1933 Diexi earthquake	China	Earthquake	August 25
1934	10,700–12,000	1934 Nepal–India earthquake	Nepal, India	Earthquake	January 15
1935	145,000	1935 Yangtze flood	China	Flood	July 6
1936	5,000+	1936 North American heat wave	United States, Canada	Heat wave	June–September
1937	11,021	1937 Great Hong Kong typhoon	China	Tropical cyclone	September 2
1938	715+	1938 Hanshin flood	Japan	Flood	July
1939	32,700–32,968	1939 Erzincan earthquake	Turkey	Earthquake	December 27
1940	1,000	1940 Vrancea earthquake	Romania	Earthquake	November 10
1941	1,200	1941 Jabal Razih earthquake	Yemen	Earthquake	January 11
1942	61,000	1942 West Bengal cyclone	India	Tropical cyclone	October 14–18
1943	2,824–5,000	1943 Tosya–Ladik earthquake	Turkey	Earthquake	November 27
1944	10,000	1944 San Juan earthquake	Argentina	Earthquake	January 15
1945	4,000	1945 Balochistan earthquake	Pakistan	Earthquake	November 28
1946	2,550	1946 Dominican Republic earthquake	Dominican Republic	Earthquake	August 4
1947	1,077	Typhoon Kathleen	Japan	Tropical cyclone	September 15
1948	10,000–110,000	1948 Ashgabat earthquake	Soviet Union, Iran	Earthquake	October 6
1949	7,200	1949 Khait earthquake	Tajikistan	Earthquake	July 10
1950	4,800	1950 Assam-Tibet earthquake	India, China	Earthquake	August 15
1951	4,800	1951 Manchuria flood	China	Flood	September 18
1952	2,336	1952 Severo-Kurilsk earthquake	Russia	Earthquake	November 4
1953	2,551	North Sea flood of 1953	Netherlands, Belgium, England, Scotland	Flood	January 31 – February 1
1954	33,000	1954 Yangtze floods	China	Flood	June–September
1955	1,023+	Hurricane Janet	Lesser Antilles, Mexico	Tropical cyclone	September 22–30
1956	4,935	Typhoon Wanda	China	Tropical cyclone	August 1
1957	1,500	1957 Sangchal earthquake	Iran	Earthquake	July 2
1958	1,269	Typhoon Ida	Japan	Tropical cyclone	September 26
1959	5,098	Typhoon Vera	Japan	Tropical cyclone	September 26
1960	14,174	Severe Cyclonic Storm Ten	East Pakistan (now Bangladesh)	Tropical cyclone	October 31
1961	11,468	Cyclone Winnie	East Pakistan (now Bangladesh)	Tropical cyclone	May 6–9
1962	50,935	Tropical Storm Harriet	Thailand, East Pakistan (now Bangladesh)	Tropical cyclone	October 19–31
1963	22,000	Extremely Severe Cyclonic Storm Two	East Pakistan (now Bangladesh)	Tropical cyclone	May 28
1964	7,000	Tropical Storm Joan	Vietnam	Tropical cyclone	November 4–11
1965	47,000	1965 Bengal cyclones	East Pakistan (now Bangladesh)	Tropical cyclone	May 11–12 and June 1–2
1966	8,064	1966 Xingtai earthquakes	China	Earthquake	March 22
1967	10,000	1967 Paradip cyclone	India	Tropical cyclone	October 26
1968	15,000	1968 Dasht-e Bayaz and Ferdows earthquakes	Iran	Earthquake	August 31
1969	3,000	1969 Yangjiang earthquake	China	Earthquake	July 26
1970	300,000–500,000	1970 Bhola cyclone	India, East Pakistan (now Bangladesh)	Tropical cyclone	November 13
1971	100,000	Hanoi and Red River Delta flood	North Vietnam	Flood	August 1
1972	5,374	1972 Qir earthquake	Iran	Earthquake	April 10
1972	4,000–11,000	1972 Managua earthquake	Nicaragua	Earthquake	December 23
1973	2,175–2,204	1973 Luhuo earthquake	China	Earthquake	February 6
1974	8,210+	Hurricane Fifi	Honduras, Nicaragua, El Salvador, Guatemala, Belize, Mexico	Tropical cyclone	September 18–20
1975	26,000–240,000	1975 Banqiao Dam failure disaster triggered by Typhoon Nina	China	Tropical cyclone	August 7
1976	242,419–655,000	1976 Tangshan earthquake	China	Earthquake	July 28
1977	10,000–50,000	1977 Andhra Pradesh cyclone	India	Tropical cyclone	November 19
1978	15,000–25,000	1978 Tabas earthquake	Iran	Earthquake	September 16
1979	2,078	Hurricane David	Dominican Republic, Dominica	Tropical cyclone	August 15 – September 8
1980	2,633–5,000	1980 El Asnam earthquake	Algeria	Earthquake	October 10
1981	3,000	1981 Golbaf earthquake	Iran	Earthquake	June 11
1982	2,800	1982 North Yemen earthquake	Yemen	Earthquake	December 13
1983	1,342	1983 Erzurum earthquake	Turkey	Earthquake	October 30
1984	1,474	Typhoon Ike	Philippines	Tropical cyclone	August 26 – September 6
1985	23,000	Armero tragedy	Colombia	Volcanic eruption	November 13
1986	1,746	Lake Nyos disaster	Cameroon	Limnic eruption	August 21
1987	1,000	1987 Ecuador earthquakes	Ecuador	Earthquake	March 6
1988	25,000–50,000	1988 Armenian earthquake	Armenia	Earthquake	December 7
1989	3,814	1989 Sichuan flood	China	Flood	July 27
1990	35,000–45,000	1990 Manjil–Rudbar earthquake	Iran	Earthquake	June 21
1991	138,866	1991 Bangladesh cyclone	Bangladesh	Tropical cyclone	April 24–30
1992	2,500	1992 Flores earthquake and tsunami	Indonesia	Earthquake, Tsunami	December 12
1993	9,748	1993 Latur earthquake	India	Earthquake	September 30
1994	3,063	Typhoon Fred	China, Taiwan	Tropical cyclone	August 21
1995	6,434	Great Hanshin earthquake	Japan	Earthquake	January 17
1996	1,077	1996 Andhra Pradesh cyclone	India	Tropical cyclone	November 4–7
1997	3,123	Tropical Storm Linda	Vietnam, Thailand	Tropical cyclone, Flood	November 1–9
1998	11,374	Hurricane Mitch	Honduras, Nicaragua, El Salvador, Guatemala, Belize, Mexico	Tropical cyclone	October 22 – November 9
1999	10,000–30,000	Vargas tragedy	Venezuela	Mudslide, Flood	December 14–16
2000	700–800	2000 Mozambique flood	Mozambique	Flood	February–March

=== 21st century ===
Year	Death toll	Event	Countries affected	Type	Date
2001	13,805–20,023	2001 Gujarat earthquake	India	Earthquake	January 26
2002	1,200	2002 Hindu Kush earthquakes	Afghanistan	Earthquake	March 25
2003	72,000	2003 European heatwave	Europe	Heat wave	July – August
2004	227,898	2004 Indian Ocean earthquake and tsunami	Indonesia, Sri Lanka, India, Thailand, Maldives, Somalia	Earthquake, Tsunami	December 26
2005	86,000–87,351	2005 Kashmir earthquake	India, Pakistan	Earthquake	October 8
2006	5,749–5,778	2006 Yogyakarta earthquake	Indonesia	Earthquake	May 26
2007	15,000	Cyclone Sidr	Bangladesh, India	Tropical cyclone	November 11 – 16
2008	138,373	Cyclone Nargis	Myanmar	Tropical cyclone	April 27 – May 3
2009	1,115	2009 Sumatra earthquakes	Indonesia	Earthquake	September 30
2010	100,000–316,000	2010 Haiti earthquake	Haiti	Earthquake	January 12
2011	19,749	2011 Tōhoku earthquake and tsunami	Japan	Earthquake, Tsunami	March 11
2012	1,901	Typhoon Bopha	Philippines	Tropical cyclone	December 4 – 5
2013	6,340	Typhoon Haiyan	Philippines, Vietnam, China	Tropical cyclone	November 8 – 10
2014	2,700	2014 Badakhshan mudslides	Afghanistan	Landslide	May 2
2015	8,964	April 2015 Nepal earthquake	Nepal, India	Earthquake	April 25
2016	1,111	2016 Indian heat wave	India	Heat wave	April – May
2017	3,059	Hurricane Maria	Puerto Rico, Dominica	Tropical cyclone	September 19 – 21
2018	4,340	2018 Sulawesi earthquake and tsunami	Indonesia	Earthquake, Tsunami	September 28
2019	3,951+	2019 European heatwaves	Europe	Heat wave	June – July
2020	6,511	2020 South Asian floods	Afghanistan, Bangladesh, India, Nepal, Pakistan, Sri Lanka	Floods	May – October
2021	2,248	2021 Haiti earthquake	Haiti	Earthquake	August 14
2022	24,501–70,000 (Note: Figure represents deaths reported by authorities. In 2024, the Barcelona Institute for Global Health computed a death toll of >70,000 by analysing daily temperature and mortality data.)	2022 European heatwaves	Europe	Heat wave	June 12 – September 12
2023	59,259–62,013	2023 Turkey–Syria earthquakes	Turkey, Syria	Earthquake	February 6
2024	62,700	2024 European heatwaves	Europe	Heat wave	June – August
2025	5,456	2025 Myanmar earthquake	Myanmar, Thailand	Earthquake	28 March
2026	45,210	2026 European heatwaves	Europe	Heat wave	May – ongoing

== Lists of deadliest natural disasters by cause ==
=== Avalanche and landslides (landslips) ===
Rank	Death toll (estimate)	Event	Location	Date
1.	100,000	1786 Dadu River landslide dam; triggered by the 1786 Kangding-Luding earthquake	China	1786
1.	100,000	1920 Haiyuan landslides; triggered by the 1920 Haiyuan earthquake	China	1920
3.	70,000+	Landslides triggered by the 1718 Tongwei–Gansu earthquake.	China	1718
4.	22,000	1970 Huascarán avalanche; triggered by the 1970 Ancash earthquake	Peru	1970
5.	10,000–30,000	Vargas tragedy	Venezuela	1999
5.	10,253	1815 Singaraja landslide; triggered by 1815 Bali earthquake	Indonesia	1815
5.	10,000	White Friday avalanches	Italy	1916
8.	5,000–28,000	Khait landslide	Tajikistan	1949
9.	4,000–6,000	1941 Huaraz avalanche	Peru	1941
9.	4,000	1962 Huascarán avalanche	Peru	1962

=== Disease outbreaks ===
Death counts are historical totals unless indicated otherwise. Events in boldface are ongoing.

Rank	Death toll (estimate)	Event	Location	Date	Pathogen − (disease caused)
1.	75–200 million	Black Death	Europe, Asia and North Africa	1346–1353	Yersinia pestis − (Plague)
2.	50 million+ (17–100 million)	Spanish flu	Worldwide	1918–1920	Influenza A virus subtype H1N1 − (Influenza/"the flu")
3.	**44.2 million (as of 2026)**	**HIV/AIDS pandemic**	Worldwide	1981–present	Human immunodeficiency virus (HIV) − (HIV/AIDS)
4.	30–50 million	Plague of Justinian	Europe and West Asia	541–542	Yersinia pestis − (Plague)
5.	7–29 million	COVID-19 pandemic	Worldwide	2019–2023 (Note: The disease was a public health emergency of international concern from January 30, 2020, to May 5, 2023.)	SARS-CoV-2 − (COVID-19)
6.	12–24 million (Indian Subcontinent and China)	Third plague pandemic	Worldwide	1855–1960	Yersinia pestis − (Bubonic plague)
7.	5–15 million	Cocoliztli Epidemic of 1545–1548	Mexico	1545–1548	Uncertain. Likely Salmonella enterica subsp. enterica − (Enteric fever) or viral hemorrhagic fever but no consensus.
8.	5–10 million	Antonine Plague	Roman Empire	165–180 (possibly up to 190)	Likely Variola − (Smallpox), possibly alongside Measles morbillivirus − (Measles)
9.	5–8 million	1520 Mexico smallpox epidemic	Mexico	1519–1520	Variola virus − (Smallpox)
10.	2.5 million	1918–1922 Russia typhus epidemic	Russia	1918–1922	Rickettsia prowazekii − (Epidemic typhus)

=== Earthquakes ===
Rank	Death toll (estimate)	Event	Location	Date
1.	242,419–655,000	1976 Tangshan earthquake	China	July 28, 1976
2.	110,000−316,000	2010 Haiti earthquake	Haiti	January 12, 2010
3.	250,000–300,000	526 Antioch earthquake	Byzantine Empire (now Turkey)	May 526
4.	273,407	1920 Haiyuan earthquake	Ningxia, Republic of China (now People's Republic of China)	December 16, 1920
5.	270,000	1303 Hongdong earthquake	Mongol Empire (now China)	September 17, 1303
6.	260,000	115 Antioch earthquake	Roman Empire (now Turkey)	December 13, 115
7.	230,000	1138 Aleppo earthquake	Zengid dynasty (now Syria)	October 11, 1138
7.	230,000	1139 Ganja earthquake	Seljuk Empire (now Azerbaijan)	20 September 1139
9.	227,898	2004 Indian Ocean earthquake	Indonesia	December 26, 2004
10.	200,000	856 Damghan earthquake	Abbasid Caliphate (now Iran)	December 22, 856

=== Famines ===
Note: Some of these famines may have been caused or partially caused by humans.

Rank	Death toll	Event	Location	Date
1.	11,000,000–40,000,000	Great Chinese Famine	China	1959–1961
2.	25,000,000	Chinese famine of 1906–1907	Qing dynasty	1906–1907
3.	9,000,000–13,000,000	Northern Chinese Famine of 1876–1879	Qing dynasty	1876–1879
4.	11,000,000	Chalisa famine	North India	1783–1784
4.	11,000,000	Doji bara famine or Skull famine	India	1789–1793
6.	10,000,000	Great Bengal famine of 1770, incl. Bihar & Orissa	British company India	1769–1773
7.	7,500,000	Great European Famine	Europe	1315–1317
8.	7,400,000	Deccan famine of 1630–1632	Mughal Empire, now India	1630–1632
9.	5,000,000–8,000,000	Soviet famine of 1930–1933	Soviet Union	1930–1933
10.	8,200,000	Indian Great Famine of 1876–1878	British India	1876–1878

=== Floods ===
Note: Some of these floods and landslides may be partially caused by humans – for example, by failure of dams, levees, seawalls or retaining walls.
This list does not include the man-made 1938 Yellow River flood caused entirely by a deliberate man-made act (an act of war, destroying dikes). Some of the death tolls below are unverified, see separate lists.

Rank	Death toll	Event	Location	Date
1.	422,499–4,000,000	1931 China floods	China	1931
2.	930,000–2,000,000	1887 Yellow River (Huang He) flood	China	1887
3.	230,000	1975 Banqiao Dam failure	China	1975
4.	145,000	1935 Yangtze flood	China	1935
5.	100,000+	St. Felix's flood, storm surge	Holy Roman Empire (now the Netherlands)	1530
7.	100,000	1911 Yangtze River flood	China	1911
8.	100,000	The flood of 1099	Netherlands and England	1099
9.	50,000–80,000	St. Lucia's flood, storm surge	Holy Roman Empire (now the Netherlands)	1287
10.	60,000	North Sea flood, storm surge	Holy Roman Empire (now the Netherlands)	1212

=== Hailstorm ===
Rank	Death toll	Event	Location	Date
1.	246	1888 Moradabad hailstorm	India	April 30, 1888
2.	200	1932 Henan hailstorm	China	July 19, 1932
3.	92	1986 Gopalganj hailstorm	Bangladesh	April 14, 1986
4.	25	2002 Henan hailstorm	China	July 19, 2002
5.	23	1923 Rostov	Russia (then Soviet Union)	July 10, 1923
5.	23	2009 Anhui Province	China	June 7, 2009
7.	22	1930 Siatista district, Greek Macedonia	Greece	June 1930
8.	14	2009 Anhui Province	China	June 14, 2009
9.	9	2003 Dingxi Prefecture, Gansu	China	July 22, 2003
10.	8	1784 Winnsborough, South Carolina	United States	May 8, 1784

=== Heat waves ===
Note: Measuring the number of deaths caused by a heat wave requires complicated statistical analysis, since heat waves tend to cause large numbers of deaths among people weakened by other conditions. As a result, the number of deaths is only known with any accuracy for heat waves in the modern era in countries with developed healthcare systems.

Rank	Death toll	Event	Location	Date
1.	72,000	2003 European heatwave	Europe	2003
2.	62,700	2024 European heatwaves	Europe	2024
3.	56,000	2010 Russian heat wave	Russia	2010
4.	24,501-70,000	2022 European heatwaves	Europe	2022
5.	47,000	2023 European heatwaves	Europe	2023
6.	45,210	2026 European heatwaves	Europe	2026
7.	41,072	1911 France heat wave	France	1911
8.	14,507–16,500	2025 European heatwaves	Europe	2025
9.	9,500	1901 eastern United States heat wave	United States	1901
10.	5,000–10,000	1988–1990 North American drought	United States	1988

=== Limnic eruptions ===
Note: Only 2 cases in recorded history.

Rank	Death toll	Event	Location	Date
1.	1,746	Lake Nyos disaster	Cameroon	August 21, 1986
2.	37	Lake Monoun disaster	Cameroon	August 15, 1984

=== Tornadoes ===
Rank	Death toll	Event	Location	Date
1.	1,300	The Daulatpur–Saturia tornado	Manikganj, Bangladesh	1989
2.	695	The 1925 Tri-State tornado	United States (Missouri–Illinois–Indiana)	1925
3.	681	The 1973 Faridpur District tornado	Bangladesh	1973
4.	660	1969 East Pakistan tornado	East Pakistan (now Bangladesh)	1969
5.	600	1996 Bangladesh tornado	Bangladesh	1996
6.	600	The Valletta, Malta tornado	Malta	1551 or 1556
7.	500	The 1851 Sicily tornadoes	Sicily, Two Sicilies (now Italy)	1851
7.	500	Narail-Magura tornado	Jessore, East Pakistan, Pakistan (now Bangladesh)	1964
7.	500	Madaripur-Shibchar tornado	Bangladesh	1977
10.	400	The 1984 Soviet Union tornado outbreak	Soviet Union (Volga Federal District, Central Federal District, and Northwestern Federal District in Russia)	1984

=== Tropical cyclones ===
Note: Earlier versions of this list have included the so-called "Bombay Cyclone of 1882" in tenth position, but this supposed event has been proven to be a hoax.

Rank	Death toll	Event	Location	Date
1.	500,000+	1970 Bhola cyclone	East Pakistan (now Bangladesh)	November 13, 1970
2.	300,000	1839 Coringa cyclone	British India (now India and Bangladesh)	November 25, 1839
3.	300,000+	1737 Calcutta cyclone	British India (now India and Bangladesh)	October 11, 1737
4.	229,000	Super Typhoon Nina—contributed to Banqiao Dam failure	China	August 7, 1975
5.	200,000	Great Backerganj Cyclone of 1876	British Raj (now Bangladesh)	October 31, 1876
6.	138,866	1991 Bangladesh cyclone	Bangladesh	April 29, 1991
7.	138,373	Cyclone Nargis	Myanmar	May 2, 2008
8.	100,000	July 1780 typhoon	Canton and Macao	1780
9.	60,000+	1864 Calcutta cyclone	India and Bangladesh	October 5, 1864
10.	50,000-220,000	1912 China typhoon	China	August 29, 1912

=== Tsunamis ===
Note: A possible tsunami on 22 May 1782 that caused about 40,000 deaths in the Taiwan Strait area may have been of "meteorological" origin (a cyclone).

Rank	Death toll	Event	Location	Date
1.	227,898	2004 Indian Ocean earthquake and tsunami	Indian Ocean	December 26, 2004
2.	~80,000	1908 Messina earthquake	Italy	December 28, 1908
3.	36,417	1883 eruption of Krakatoa	Indonesia	August 27, 1883
4.	40,000–50,000	1755 Lisbon earthquake	Portugal	November 1, 1755
5.	30,000–100,000	Minoan eruption	Greece	2nd Millennium BC
6.	31,000	1498 Meiō earthquake	Japan	September 20, 1498
7.	30,000	1707 Hōei earthquake	Japan	October 28, 1707
8.	27,122	1896 Sanriku earthquake	Japan	June 15, 1896
9.	25,674	1868 Arica earthquake	Chile	August 13, 1868
10.	5,700–50,000	365 Crete earthquake	Greece	July 21, 365

=== Volcanic eruptions ===
Rank	Death toll	Event	Location	Date
1.	71,000+	1815 eruption of Mount Tambora (see also Year Without a Summer)	Indonesia	April 10, 1815
2.	36,000+	1883 eruption of Krakatoa	Indonesia	August 27, 1883
3.	30,000	1902 eruption of Mount Pelée	Martinique	May 7, 1902
4.	23,000	Armero tragedy	Colombia	November 13, 1985
5.	15,000	1792 Unzen earthquake and tsunami	Japan	May 21, 1792
6.	13,000	Eruption of Mount Vesuvius in 79 AD	Italy	79
7.	10,000+	1586 Kelud eruption	Indonesia	1586
8.	6,000	1902 Santa Maria eruption	Guatemala	October 24, 1902
9.	5,000	1919 Kelud mudflow	Indonesia	May 19, 1919
10.	4,011	1822 Galunggung eruption	Indonesia	1822

=== Wildfires ===
Rank	Death toll	Event	Location	Date
1.	1,200–2,500	Peshtigo fire	Wisconsin, United States	October 8, 1871
2.	1,000+	Kursha-2 fire	Soviet Union	August 3, 1936
3.	453	Cloquet fire	Minnesota, United States	October 12, 1918
4.	418–476	Great Hinckley Fire	Minnesota, United States	September 1, 1894
5.	282	Thumb Fire	Michigan, United States	September 5, 1881
6.	240	1997 Indonesian forest fires	Sumatra and Kalimantan, Indonesia	September 1997
7.	160–300	1825 Miramichi fire	Canada	October 7, 1825
8.	223	Matheson Fire	Ontario, Canada	July 29, 1916
9.	211	1987 Black Dragon fire	China and Soviet Union	May 1, 1987
10.	173	Black Saturday bushfires	Australia	February 7, 2009

=== Winter storms ===
Rank	Death toll (estimate)	Event	Location	Date
1.	4,000	1972 Iran blizzard	Iran	1972
2.	3,000	Carolean Death March	Norway	1719
3.	926	2008 Afghanistan blizzard	Afghanistan	2008
4.	400	Great Blizzard of 1888	United States	1888
5.	353	Great Appalachian Storm of 1950	United States	1950
6.	318	1993 Storm of the Century	United States	1993
7.	299–978	2021 North American winter storm	United States and Mexico	2021
8.	286	December 1960 nor'easter	United States	1960
9.	250	Great Lakes Storm of 1913	United States and Canada (Great Lakes region)	1913
10.	235	Schoolhouse Blizzard	United States	1888

== See also ==
- List of countries by natural disaster risk
- List of all known deadly earthquakes since 1900
- List of disasters in Canada
- List of disasters in Indonesia
- List of disasters in the Philippines
- List of disasters in Thailand
- List of natural disasters in the British Isles
- List of natural disasters in Haiti
- List of natural disasters in New Zealand
- List of natural disasters in Pakistan
- List of natural disasters in the United States
- Natural disasters in India
- Lists of nuclear disasters and radioactive incidents
- Global catastrophic risk

Other lists organized by death toll

- List of accidents and disasters by death toll
- List of battles by casualties
- List of disasters in Antarctica by death toll
- List of disasters in Australia by death toll
- List of disasters in Canada by death toll
- List of disasters in Croatia by death toll
- List of disasters in Great Britain and Ireland by death toll
- List of disasters in New Zealand by death toll
- List of disasters in Poland by death toll
- List of disasters in Romania by death toll
- List of disasters in the United States by death toll
- Tsunamis affecting the British Isles
