= Chrysa Spiliotis =

Greek actress, playwright, and radio presenter (1956–2018)

- Born: Chrysi Spilioti; 12 January 1956; Filothei, Greece
- Died: 23 July 2018 (aged 62); Mati, Greece
- Occupations: Actress; playwright; radio presenter
- Spouse: Dimitris Tournavitis

Chrysa Spiliotis (also Chrisa Spilioti; Greek: Χρυσή (Χρύσα) Σπηλιώτη; 12 January 1956 – 23 July 2018) was a Greek stage and television actress, playwright and radio presenter.

== Early life ==
Spiliotis was born and grew up in Filothei in present-day Greater Athens. She spent part of her childhood on the Greek island of Evia. Spiliotis attended the National Theatre of Greece Drama School, and after graduating, studied improvisation in France.

== Career ==
In 1996 she began writing plays. More than ten of her works have been translated into several foreign languages and have been performed in theaters in Greece and abroad (including New York, London, Croatia, and the Netherlands). Her plays include Who discovered America?, Scottish shower, Aga-shu and fi, With a difference of breast, Fire and water, Who Sleeps Tonight? and The Eye of the Tiger. She directed some theatrical performances of her plays.

Spiliotis taught playwriting at the Theater of Changes, the International Theater Institute, the Faculty of Theatre Studies at the University of Athens, the Theatre of Cyprus and Cyprus' "Open Theatre." She also served as a member of the board of directors of the Central Theater of Northern Greece and the International Theater Institute.

Spiliotis first appeared on television in 1997 in the Mega TV soap opera The Queen of the Queen. On stage, she collaborated with directors such as Minos Volanakis, G. Sebastikoglou and others, and appeared in various theaters such as "Theater of the South", the "Open Theater", "Theater of Spring", "Theater of Kefallinia", National Theater and "Free Stage". Spiliotis taught acting at the Dramatic School-Diomidis Fotiadis and in kindergartens and elementary schools in Attica.

For three years, she wrote the scripts for ERT's daily children's programme Around Everyone. She also wrote and presented to ERT, in collaboration with Annetta Papathanasiou and Olympia Basklavani, the children's series Lights please and Bourboulethres and the children's play In the Country of the Carnival. She wrote fairy tales for ERT's radio program And sweet dreams, and the series Thousand Nights and a Nazareth and the script for the TV series At the Right Time, which was screened by ERT.

== Personal life and death ==
Spiliotis was married to Dimitris Tournavitis, a musician and former athlete.

Spiliotis and her husband both died in a wildfire in Mati, Attica. She was reported missing on 23 July 2018 and her body was identified on 29 July, two days after her husband's corpse was identified. Spiliotis apparently reached safety at a beach, where she left her dog, but returned to the area of the fire to find her husband.

At the Athens Festival on the evening of 27 July 2018, festival director Vangelis Theodoropoulos dedicated the performance of Thesmophoriazousai to Spiliotis, who was at the time listed as missing, and all victims of the wildfires. A statement of condolences from the Greek Ministry of Culture concluded, "Chrysa Spiliotis was a charismatic actress, a special woman, a bright presence."

== See also ==
- List of solved missing person cases (post-2000)
