= Gaoyou Lake =

Lake in China

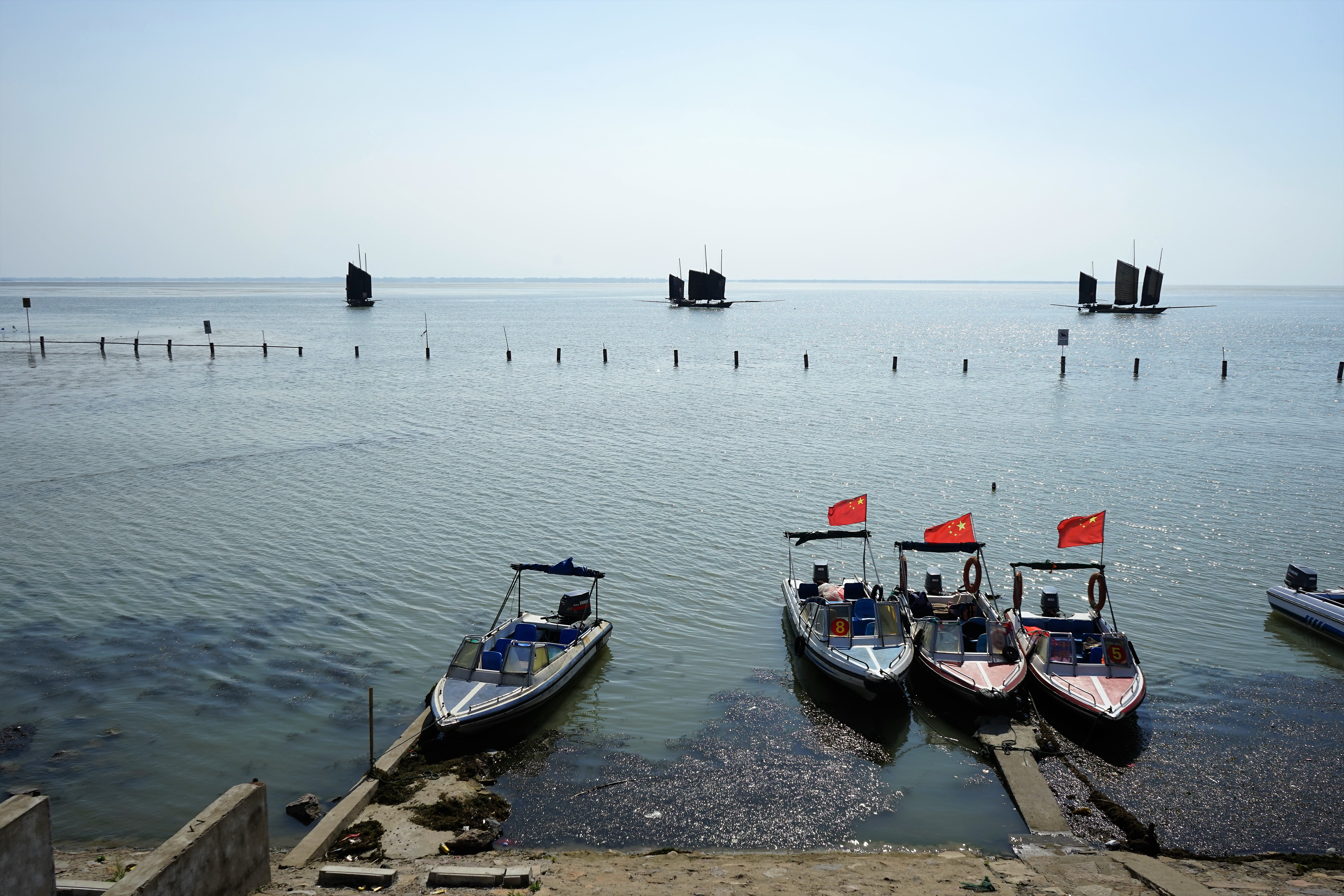

- Location within China
- Coordinates: 32°50′N 119°20′E
- Basin countries: China
- Max. length: 39 km (24 mi)
- Max. width: 30 km (19 mi)
- Surface area: 674.7 km^{2} (300 sq mi)
- Average depth: 1.44 m (5 ft)
- Max. depth: 2.4 m (8 ft)
- Water volume: 971.6×10^{6} m^{3} (34.31×10^{9} cu ft)
- Surface elevation: 5.7 m (19 ft)
- Settlements: Gaoyou

Gaoyou Lake (Chinese: 高邮湖; pinyin: Gāoyòu Hú) is the sixth largest freshwater lake in China. It is located between Anhui Province and Jiangsu Province. In a sense, Gaoyou Lake is a manmade lake, and its creation is part of a long story about flood control and hydraulic engineering in ancient China. Gaoyou Lake is now part of the Huai River system as the Huai River flows south through Gaoyou Lake on its way to the Yangtze River and the Pacific. It is about 39 kilometres (24 mi) long and 30 kilometres (19 mi) wide, covering approximately 674.7 square kilometres (300 sq mi).

== See also ==
- 1931 China floods
- Gaoyou
- Grand Canal (China)
- Chinese ship Gaoyouhu
