= 1935 Yangtze flood =

Deadly 20th century flood in China

1935 Yangtze River Flood
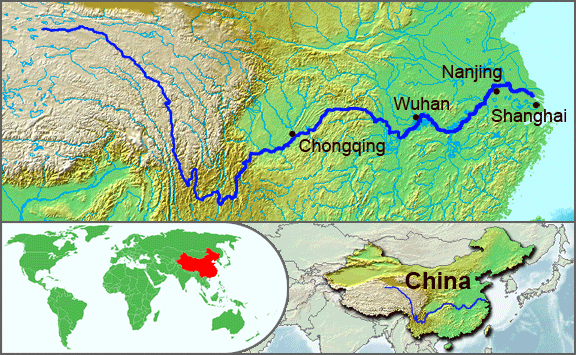
- Map of the Yangtze River
- Date: July 6, 1935
- Location: Hubei, Hunan, Jiangxi, Anhui, Jiangsu and Zhejiang
- Deaths: 145,000
- Property damage: $333 million (about $6.2 billion today)

The 1935 Yangtze flood was a flood in China that struck during a decade of general flooding, famine and social turmoil. It is considered to be the fourth deadliest flood in recorded history, with a death toll of 145,000 and displacement of millions. As a result of the flood, millions of survivors were faced with hardship due to displacement, injury, loss of property as well as food shortages and famine.

Four years earlier in 1931, after three years of drought, both the Yangtze and Yellow Rivers experienced significant flooding. Known as the 1931 China floods, they were considered to be the worst non-pandemic disaster of the century because of the millions of deaths they led to indirectly. With the 1935 floods following so soon after the 1931 floods, flood relief infrastructure, which included drainage reservoirs and floodwater channels, was soon overwhelmed.

The Yangtze River flooding primarily affected the provinces of Hubei, Hunan, Jiangxi, Anhui, Jiangsu and Zhejiang, all of which are located in the middle to lower reaches of the river.

== Background ==
=== About the Yangtze River ===
The Yangtze River, literally named "the Long River" in Mandarin, is considered to be the longest river in Asia. It is also the third longest river in the world; stretching 6,315 kilometres from the mountains of Tibet to the Eastern Sea. The name Yangtze more specifically refers to the downriver portion of the river along the coastal plain, which passes by the city of Shanghai. Since ancient times, the Yangtze River has been central to the development of Chinese culture as it has been home to human cultures for more than 20,000 years. This is because the river served as an essential trade route for China's cities and agricultural communities. This is because the river basin of the Yangtze River provides year-round access to water because it is a key source of irrigation for the farming communities of the region, creating some of the richest agricultural territory in the nation.

Over time many cities have been constructed very close to the banks of the Yangtze River in order to utilize this rich agricultural territory. Currently, the entirety of these cities makes up more than one-third of the population of China. Consequently, these cities have been vulnerable to significant damage in times of flood.

Throughout history, three-quarters of China's floods have been caused by the Yangtze River. Usually the Yangtze floods occur during most non-drought years. During monsoon season, which occurs from June to September, flooding and mudslides have consequently been perennial problems as they typically lead to several hundred deaths annually. In the case of the 1935 flood, the mudslides occurring as a result of the 1931 China Floods significantly eroded the natural flood barriers which existed previously making the consequences of this flood more severe.

Deforestation, which was becoming widespread in China by the 1930s, exacerbated the problems of the floods. This is because plant root systems help to absorb the flood water and assist in holding the soil in place. The removal of these root systems significantly increased the likelihood of landslides occurring.

=== History of flooding on the Yangtze River ===
The first major flood of the Yangtze River recorded in modern history occurred in 1911. Historical reports have indicated that the major flood covered 1,126 square kilometres and led to major devastation in Shanghai. It was reported that more than 200,000 died and hundreds of thousands were left homeless and destitute. Additionally, the flood also ruined important crops in surrounding farmland and destroyed food supplies in the cities and towns in the region.

In the late 1920s, China suffered from 3 years of drought. This drought left the soil parched and unable to effectively absorb incoming rain.

In August 1931, China experienced heavy rains and the Yangtze River flooded again. This created one of the deadliest natural disasters in known history. The number of people killed in the 1931 China floods was difficult to determine with official estimates ranging from 140,000 to 3 million people. The devastation of the 1931 flood was made worse by the social turbulence occurring concurrently as the nation was enduring a civil war at that time. This meant that civil authorities were preoccupied with other priorities. Consequently, civil authorities failed to take essential measures to significantly reduce overflow such as gathering sediment along with the populated areas of the river.

In the wake of the 1931 flood, China built more effective levees in an effort to prevent future floods and to protect the nationally important agricultural territory between Beijing, Shanghai and Hankow. However, these efforts were made complicated because of the ongoing social turmoil of the Chinese Civil War (1927–1950) and the war with Japan. State funds were being filtered to the military as a result of this social turmoil, leaving insufficient support for the agricultural and rural communities. Additionally, the 1931 flood created mudslides that destroyed existing natural flood barriers along the sides of the river, making the area around the Yangtze River significantly vulnerable to a potential flood.

=== Environmental causes ===
The Yangtze River drains one-fifth of the land area of China. Its river basin is home to one-third of the country's population. As a result, flooding along the river has always been a major problem. The rainy season in China occurs between May and June in the areas south of the Yangtze River and July and August in areas north of the Yangtze River. The huge river system of the Yangtze River receives water from both the northern and southern flanks, causing its flood season to extend from May to August, the entirety of the time period.

The relatively dense population and rich cities along the river make the floods that occur more deadly and costly. This is because tens of millions of people live in the floodplain of the Yangtze valley. This area naturally floods every summer and is habitable only because it is protected by the existing river dikes. Floods large enough to overflow the dikes have caused great distress to those who live and farm there.

China's Yellow River, spanning 4,680 kilometres, is the sixth-longest river in the world. The Yangtze along with the Yellow River forms a pillar of China's culture. As a result, communities along the Yangtze River have struggled with floods and famine for thousands of years. The cities of Shanghai, Beijing and Hankow form a triangle of cities that sit around an essential agricultural zone that is particularly susceptible to flooding. It is estimated that within the mid-1800s alone, as many as 40 to 50 million Chinese people died due to the flooding of the Yangtze and Yellow Rivers.

Ecologists have since determined that the process of deforestation and the conversion of lakes surrounding the river in order to create levees and agricultural land helped to make the region more vulnerable to flooding. This is because deforestation removed the natural barriers that once absorbed floodwaters and prevented the rising rivers from spilling into the surrounding valleys. Additionally, meteorologists also now believe that an unusually high number of typhoons off the coast contributed to the 1935 flooding of the Yangtze river which, while not as severe as the 1931 flood, devastated a China population already suffering from famine and war.

== Sequence of events ==
The 1935 Yangtze River Flood was a regional flood. It resulted in major floods in the Han River and Li River, the main tributaries of the middle Yangtze River.

The survey at the mainstream of the Han River, Danjiangkou, estimated a flood peak flow of 50,000 cubic meters per second, which ranks it as the 2nd largest flood in 400 years.

The events of the 1935 Yangtze River Flood occurred on July 6. On that day the water level in the middle reaches of the Han River valley rose sharply, flooding Xiangfan city as well as many other towns. The estimated flow rate observed at the Nianpan Mountain station was between 52,000 and 57,900 cubic metres per second. The left bank of the Han River, Shizikou, had seen its dike burst, leaving the area of Hanbei flooded. The middle and lower reaches of the Han River flooded 427,000 hectares of farmland and drowned 80,000 people.

Additionally, the flow rate at the Sanjiangkou station on the Li River was observed to be between 31,000 and 33,000 cubic metres per second and more than 30,000 people drowned in multiple areas of the valley and its lower plains.

Finally, on the same day within Changyang county, the Qing River, observed a flood peak flow of 15,000 cubic meters per second, which resulted in an entire street in the country being washed away. Heavy rains at the Yangtze river mainly happened within the Three Gorges area. The peak flow observed at Yichang city was 56,900 cubic metres per second. The flood superimposed the one from the Qing River with the 7,000 cubic metres per second flood from the Juzhang River when it arrived at Shashi district, creating a very disastrous situation.

As a result, the dike of Wanjiang city, located on the south bank of Jing River burst. Consequently, 23,000 people died when the Jing River dike on the north bank burst along the top of the Juzhang River in the upper part of Wancheng due to flooding along the Yangtze River. The flood disaster happened mainly in the middle reaches of the Yangtze River.

== Social and economic impact ==
The after-effects of this catastrophe were so dreadful that many of those who survived this disaster eventually died due to starvation. Similar to the flood of 1931, there had been a drought the previous year which had led to a grain shortage, which was then exacerbated as the existing crops and seed were washed away and 1.5-million hectares of total farmland was flooded. The early summer flooding of the Han River, a tributary of the Yangtze River, also resulted in the rice shortage of 1935 because much of the rice-producing infrastructure of Hubei Province was significantly damaged.

The spread of diseases as a result of the catastrophe included conjunctivitis, dermatitis, tuberculosis. The corpses from the fatalities also led to the spread of several contagious diseases.

At the time of the 1935 flood, China was not only recovering from the earlier 1931 disaster but it was also in the midst of a prolonged armed conflict with Japan; which had been occurring intermittently throughout the decade and was in the process of leading up to the Second Sino-Japanese War (1937–45). This was a result of Japan's repeated attempts to dominate China as Japan was intent on capturing China's natural resources, food and labour in order to service its empire.

Additionally, there were also continual disputes between the Chinese Nationalist Army and the Red Army (Chinese Communist Party) in the years leading up to the Chinese Civil War. Due to this, humanitarian aid was already arriving in China before the occurrence of the flood and resulting famine. The funding for this relief effort was raised through the collection of private donations to organizations such as the Red Cross which was similar to the manner of other disasters of the era.

At the time, newspapers around the world ran articles about the devastation of this flood. These articles covered the fact that significant crops had been lost and that landslides and standing water had now made it impossible for farmers to start over and replant.

== Long term response ==
In an effort to control the flooding, plans to create a dam across the Yangtze River were first proposed in the early 1900s. In the wake of the 1935 and 1954 floods, there was increased public support for the idea. However, the project was abandoned during the second China Civil War. The plans were then resurrected in 1994 and in 2012, the dam became operational. This dam was called the Three Gorges Dam. Currently, it has the capacity to hold 22 cubic kilometres of water in its reservoir. This is projected to increase the time spans between major floods from an average of 10 years to as long as 100 years. Since the Three Gorges Dam has finished construction, there has not been another major flood to test the dam's flood prevention potential.
