= List of countries by natural disaster risk =

This article shows the list of countries by natural disaster risk according to the World Risk Index.

Thematic map of countries shaded by various components of the World Risk Index

== Rankings ==
=== Legend ===
Very low chance of disasters
Low chance of disasters
Medium chance of disasters
High chance of disasters
Very high chance of disasters

=== Rankings by country ===
Rank	Country	2022	2016	2013	2012	2011
1	Andorra	0.26%	—N/a	—N/a	—N/a	
1	Monaco	0.26%	—N/a	—N/a	—N/a	—N/a
2	San Marino	0.38%	—N/a	—N/a	—N/a	—N/a
3	São Tomé and Príncipe	0.48%	—N/a	—N/a	—N/a	—N/a
4	Luxembourg	0.52%	2.43%	2.68%	2.65%	2.70%
5	Liechtenstein	0.79%	—N/a	—N/a	—N/a	—N/a
6	Singapore	0.81%	2.27%	2.49%	2.54%	2.85%
7	Belarus	0.83%	3.11%	3.31%	3.32%	2.98%
8	Malta	0.94%	0.60%	0.61%	0.61%	0.72%
9	Bahrain	0.95%	1.69%	1.81%	1.81%	1.66%
10	Hungary	0.97%	5.32%	5.69%	5.87%	5.49%
11	Czechia	1.00%	3.37%	3.61%	3.67%	4.15%
11	Nauru	1.00%	—N/a	—N/a	—N/a	—N/a
11	Slovakia	1.00%	3.39%	3.63%	3.69%	3.38%
12	Maldives	1.02%	—N/a	—N/a	—N/a	—N/a
13	Denmark	1.03%	2.89%	3.10%	3.09%	2.86%
13	Switzerland	1.03%	2.37%	2.61%	2.59%	2.55%
14	Bhutan	1.09%	7.51%	7.98%	8.17%	13.65%
15	Austria	1.14%	3.39%	3.80%	3.75%	3.41%
16	Qatar	1.17%	0.08%	0.11%	0.10%	0.02%
17	Palau	1.25%	—N/a	—N/a	—N/a	—N/a
18	North Macedonia	1.26%	5.87%	6.28%	6.10%	6.80%
19	Cape Verde	1.27%	10.39%	10.80%	10.88%	9.47%
20	Turkmenistan	1.29%	6.44%	6.57%	6.64%	7.18%
21	Finland	1.30%	2.21%	2.28%	2.24%	2.06%
21	Moldova	1.30%	4.79%	5.05%	5.23%	4.78%
22	Lesotho	1.32%	6.84%	7.09%	7.22%	7.86%
22	Togo	1.32%	10.36%	10.34%	10.64%	10.40%
23	Brunei	1.34%	17.00%	15.58%	15.92%	14.08%
24	Botswana	1.44%	5.14%	5.37%	5.21%	5.56%
24	Slovenia	1.44%	3.41%	3.69%	3.81%	3.72%
25	Tuvalu	1.46%	—N/a	—N/a	—N/a	—N/a
26	Benin	1.61%	11.39%	11.32%	11.42%	10.90%
27	Iceland	1.65%	1.52%	1.55%	1.53%	1.56%
28	Paraguay	1.74%	3.48%	3.85%	3.84%	4.12%
28	Uzbekistan	1.74%	8.59%	8.66%	8.71%	9.37%
29	Estonia	1.82%	2.36%	2.52%	2.50%	2.25%
29	Eswatini	1.82%	7.52%	7.65%	7.84%	7.37%
30	Serbia	1.84%	7.12%	7.53%	7.67%	5.44%
31	Grenada	1.85%	1.42%	1.44%	1.44%	2.29%
32	Barbados	2.06%	1.32%	1.16%	1.15%	2.44%
32	Burkina Faso	2.06%	9.54%	9.72%	9.74%	11.58%
32	Sweden	2.06%	2.12%	2.26%	2.15%	2.00%
33	Saint Kitts and Nevis	2.07%	—N/a	—N/a	—N/a	—N/a
34	Ivory Coast	2.08%	8.88%	8.86%	9.00%	9.03%
34	Mongolia	2.08%	3.08%	3.10%	3.24%	3.43%
35	Latvia	2.14%	3.31%	3.48%	3.51%	3.09%
36	Bulgaria	2.15%	4.22%	4.43%	4.56%	4.08%
37	Niger	2.17%	11.24%	11.62%	11.93%	14.03%
38	Kazakhstan	2.18%	3.56%	3.84%	3.87%	4.04%
39	Azerbaijan	2.20%	5.54%	6.19%	6.25%	5.86%
39	Kyrgyzstan	2.20%	7.86%	8.43%	8.50%	8.48%
40	Lithuania	2.24%	2.92%	3.18%	3.23%	2.89%
41	Mali	2.25%	8.39%	8.65%	8.76%	11.51%
42	Marshall Islands	2.29%	—N/a	—N/a	—N/a	—N/a
43	Saint Vincent and the Grenadines	2.30%	—N/a	—N/a	—N/a	—N/a
44	Tajikistan	2.38%	6.72%	7.35%	7.40%	7.47%
45	Zimbabwe	2.44%	10.06%	9.96%	9.87%	9.63%
46	Bosnia and Herzegovina	2.51%	6.10%	6.42%	6.63%	6.25%
47	Seychelles	2.54%	2.55%	2.58%	2.60%	2.68%
48	Comoros	2.56%	7.29%	7.52%	7.45%	6.93%
48	Kuwait	2.56%	3.28%	3.70%	3.71%	3.71%
49	Nepal	2.62%	5.12%	5.53%	5.69%	6.15%
50	Kiribati	2.64%	1.78%	1.78%	1.78%	1.88%
51	Saint Lucia	2.69%	—N/a	—N/a	—N/a	—N/a
52	Rwanda	2.70%	7.09%	7.43%	7.60%	8.68%
53	Armenia	2.72%	6.07%	6.91%	7.05%	6.36%
54	Cyprus	2.78%	2.68%	2.77%	2.81%	3.46%
55	Uganda	2.81%	6.52%	6.69%	6.75%	7.57%
56	Laos	2.91%	5.59%	5.71%	5.73%	5.80%
57	Chad	2.92%	10.85%	11.06%	11.13%	12.25%
58	Trinidad and Tobago	2.93%	7.50%	7.65%	7.68%	6.70%
59	Zambia	2.94%	7.25%	7.46%	7.44%	8.41%
60	Burundi	3.03%	10.28%	10.46%	10.49%	11.56%
61	Ghana	3.05%	8.39%	8.81%	8.85%	9.35%
62	Bolivia	3.07%	4.58%	5.08%	5.13%	5.16%
63	Ireland	3.10%	4.60%	4.69%	4.50%	4.15%
64	Samoa	3.15%	—N/a	—N/a	—N/a	—N/a
65	Norway	3.16%	2.19%	2.35%	2.31%	2.28%
66	Romania	3.19%	5.92%	6.61%	6.78%	6.43%
67	Dominica	3.27%	—N/a	—N/a	—N/a	—N/a
68	Malawi	3.30%	7.98%	8.02%	8.18%	8.99%
68	Montenegro	3.30%	—N/a	—N/a	—N/a	—N/a
69	Central African Republic	3.34%	7.03%	6.57%	6.55%	6.95%
70	Equatorial Guinea	3.36%	4.46%	4.49%	4.47%	6.72%
71	Jordan	3.48%	4.58%	4.88%	4.90%	5.13%
72	Mauritius	3.50%	15.53%	14.89%	15.36%	15.74%
73	Lebanon	3.52%	5.01%	5.05%	5.10%	5.01%
74	Bahamas	3.75%	4.14%	3.99%	4.17%	4.52%
85	Georgia	3.79%	6.27%	6.83%	6.75%	6.97%
86	Antigua and Barbuda	3.84%	—N/a	—N/a	—N/a	—N/a
87	Ukraine	3.89%	2.97%	3.14%	3.19%	3.02%
88	Germany	3.92%	2.95%	3.24%	3.27%	2.96%
89	Tonga	3.94%	29.33%	28.23%	28.62%	29.08%
90	Netherlands	4.04%	8.24%	8.76%	8.49%	7.71%
91	Afghanistan	4.05%	9.50%	9.93%	9.79%	14.06%
92	Liberia	4.11%	7.84%	7.71%	7.86%	9.20%
93	Guinea-Bissau	4.14%	13.56%	13.09%	13.34%	13.12%
94	Belgium	4.16%	3.07%	3.42%	3.48%	3.51%
95	South Sudan	4.21%	—N/a	—N/a	—N/a	—N/a
96	Micronesia	4.36%	—N/a	—N/a	—N/a	—N/a
97	Gambia	4.45%	12.07%	11.71%	11.84%	13.90%
98	Poland	4.63%	3.20%	3.46%	3.53%	3.42%
99	Israel	4.65%	2.30%	2.49%	2.43%	2.60%
99	Jamaica	4.65%	11.83%	12.15%	12.15%	12.89%
100	Gabon	4.72%	6.04%	5.93%	6.20%	6.30%
101	Ethiopia	4.80%	7.04%	7.36%	7.35%	7.09%
102	Congo	4.85%	7.19%	7.57%	7.38%	7.71%
103	Croatia	4.86%	3.97%	4.24%	4.35%	3.71%
104	Suriname	4.87%	8.44%	8.55%	8.62%	9.25%
105	Uruguay	4.92%	4.03%	4.09%	4.12%	3.94%
106	Albania	4.98%	9.50%	10.01%	9.96%	9.98%
107	Sierra Leone	5.00%	10.21%	10.37%	10.58%	11.25%
108	Portugal	5.08%	3.45%	3.80%	3.82%	3.62%
109	Senegal	5.42%	10.38%	10.99%	11.08%	11.76%
110	United Kingdom	5.78%	3.54%	3.71%	3.65%	3.61%
111	Namibia	5.93%	5.37%	5.68%	5.72%	6.63%
111	Sri Lanka	5.93%	7.32%	7.67%	7.79%	7.84%
112	United Arab Emirates	6.52%	1.97%	2.10%	2.07%	4.09%
113	Fiji	6.54%	13.15%	14.10%	13.53%	11.13%
114	Guyana	6.64%	11.39%	11.65%	11.77%	9.02%
115	France	6.67%	2.62%	2.79%	2.78%	2.76%
116	Guinea	6.84%	8.20%	8.32%	8.55%	9.49%
117	Oman	7.27%	2.64%	2.74%	2.72%	2.80%
118	Belize	7.65%	6.55%	6.62%	6.63%	5.93%
119	Eritrea	7.70%	6.35%	6.35%	6.44%	7.22%
120	Cuba	7.97%	6.13%	6.51%	6.55%	5.99%
120	East Timor	7.97%	15.69%	16.37%	17.13%	17.45%
121	Cambodia	8.42%	16.58%	16.90%	17.17%	16.58%
122	Greece	8.55%	6.70%	7.38%	7.81%	8.27%
123	Iraq	8.65%	4.49%	4.83%	4.95%	5.77%
124	Nigeria	9.12%	7.98%	8.32%	8.28%	9.03%
125	Mauritania	9.34%	7.95%	8.26%	8.43%	9.70%
126	Italy	9.37%	4.42%	4.88%	4.82%	4.74%
127	South Africa	9.42%	5.58%	5.80%	5.90%	5.71%
128	Algeria	9.58%	7.36%	8.13%	8.15%	8.06%
129	Saudi Arabia	9.64%	1.14%	1.32%	1.31%	1.26%
130	DR Congo	9.65%	—N/a	—N/a	—N/a	—N/a
131	Spain	9.68%	3.05%	3.38%	3.40%	3.29%
132	Tunisia	9.87%	5.40%	5.90%	5.90%	5.72%
133	Haiti	9.99%	11.68%	11.88%	11.96%	11.45%
134	Sudan	10.12%	7.99%	7.87%	7.88%	9.25%
135	Morocco	10.29%	6.45%	7.13%	7.21%	7.17%
136	South Korea	10.51%	4.59%	4.94%	4.89%	4.14%
137	Vanuatu	10.64%	36.28%	36.43%	36.31%	32.00%
138	Djibouti	10.66%	10.30%	9.84%	9.96%	7.05%
139	Angola	11.02%	6.52%	6.45%	6.56%	8.02%
140	Cameroon	11.17%	10.91%	11.09%	10.96%	14.46%
141	Guatemala	11.18%	19.88%	20.88%	20.75%	20.88%
142	North Korea	11.82%	—N/a	—N/a	—N/a	—N/a
143	Brazil	12.15%	4.09%	4.26%	4.30%	4.26%
144	Syria	12.16%	5.69%	5.67%	5.68%	6.19%
145	New Zealand	13.05%	4.55%	4.69%	4.44%	4.28%
146	Dominican Republic	13.23%	10.96%	11.28%	11.63%	12.00%
147	Chile	13.84%	11.65%	12.28%	12.26%	11.97%
148	Kenya	13.92%	6.77%	7.08%	7.18%	7.24%
149	Costa Rica	14.20%	17.00%	16.94%	17.38%	16.74%
150	Libya	14.31%	3.79%	3.93%	3.80%	3.67%
151	Malaysia	14.36%	6.39%	6.45%	6.53%	6.69%
152	El Salvador	14.37%	16.05%	16.85%	16.89%	16.49%
153	Solomon Islands	14.62%	19.14%	18.11%	18.15%	23.51%
154	Argentina	15.61%	3.56%	3.76%	3.80%	3.77%
155	Honduras	16.00%	10.68%	10.91%	11.02%	12.10%
156	Turkey	16.23%	5.20%	5.52%	5.68%	5.38%
157	Tanzania	16.38%	7.65%	7.99%	8.11%	8.64%
158	Japan	17.03%	12.99%	13.56%	13.69%	13.57%
159	Panama	18.38%	7.26%	7.49%	7.69%	7.70%
160	Iran	18.48%	4.73%	4.92%	4.98%	5.11%
161	Canada	18.99%	3.01%	3.18%	3.18%	2.57%
162	Egypt	20.65%	2.29%	2.34%	2.33%	2.38%
163	Thailand	20.91%	6.19%	6.34%	6.44%	6.86%
164	Australia	21.36%	4.22%	4.51%	4.57%	4.28%
165	Nicaragua	22.35%	14.62%	15.18%	15.39%	11.91%
166	Ecuador	22.42%	7.53%	7.77%	7.94%	8.69%
167	Venezuela	22.45%	5.93%	6.16%	6.13%	6.11%
168	United States	22.73%	3.76%	3.99%	3.99%	3.72%
169	Madagascar	23.48%	11.15%	11.23%	11.50%	10.27%
170	Papua New Guinea	24.10%	16.43%	15.90%	15.81%	15.45%
171	Yemen	24.26%	5.97%	6.03%	5.98%	6.83%
172	Somalia	25.07%	—N/a	—N/a	—N/a	—N/a
173	Peru	25.41%	6.59%	7.02%	6.96%	7.82%
174	Vietnam	25.85%	12.81%	12.88%	11.21%	
175	Russia	26.54%	3.58%	3.78%	3.83%	3.56%
176	Pakistan	26.75%	6.96%	7.21%	7.25%	7.84%
177	Bangladesh	27.90%	19.17%	19.81%	20.22%	17.45%
178	China	28.70%	6.39%	6.97%	7.04%	6.90%
179	Mozambique	34.37%	8.69%	8.89%	9.09%	9.98%
180	Myanmar	35.49%	8.90%	9.10%	9.15%	8.54%
181	Mexico	37.55%	5.97%	6.39%	6.39%	6.53%
182	Colombia	38.37%	6.45%	6.90%	6.89%	6.86%
183	Indonesia	41.46%	10.24%	10.54%	10.74%	11.69%
184	India	42.31%	26.64%	27.17%	22.28%	17.68%
185	Philippines	46.82%	26.70%	27.52%	27.98%	24.32%

== See also ==
- Effects of climate change on humans
- Gamma-ray burst
- Emergency management
  - Civil defence
  - Disaster risk reduction
- Environmental disaster
  - List of environmental disasters
- Environmental emergency
- List of natural disasters by death toll
- Property insurance against natural disasters
- Survivalism
- World Conference on Disaster Risk Reduction
