= Kursha-2 =

Community in Russia destroyed by fire in 1936

Coordinates: 54.9372°N 40.5578°E

Kursha-2 fire
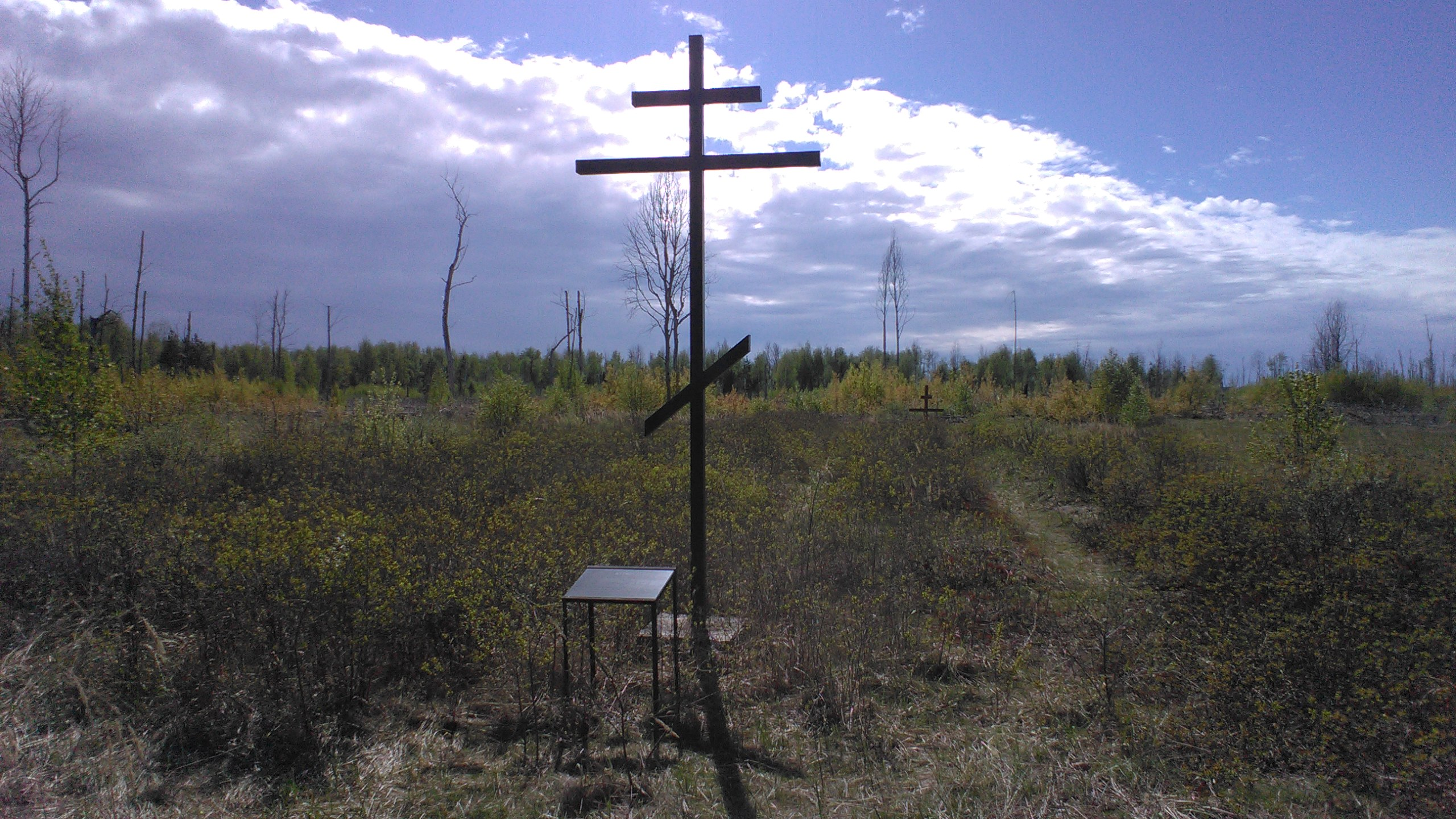
- Memorial
- Date: August 3, 1936
- Location: Kursha-2, Ryazan Oblast, RSFSR, USSR

Statistics
- Land use: Mixed, residential and forest

Impacts
- Deaths: 1,000+ (as high as over 1,200)

Kursha-2 (Russian: Ку́рша-2), named so after a road sign, was an industrial community in the Meshchera Lowlands region of Ryazan Oblast, Russia. It was built soon after the October Revolution for the exploitation of the local forests, and was annihilated by a firestorm on 3 August 1936. The disaster caused more than 1,000 human deaths, making it the second-deadliest wildfire in recorded history, behind only the Peshtigo fire of 1871.

A narrow-gauge railway ran from the Trans-Meshchyora trunk-railway to Kursha-2 and then extended to Lesomashinny and Charus. More than 1,000 lived in this woodcutters' settlement during the 1930s. Trains transported wood to Tumskaya (ru), where it was finished.

== Fire ==
At the beginning of August 1936, a firestorm started near Charus, possibly started by a spark caused by a train on the Kursha-2 - Charus line and to the south-east of Kursha-2. Alternatively, the fire could have been started by a dry thunderstorm on 2 August. The firestorm extended to the north, growing in intensity to become an aerial or crown fire, a fierce conflagration that consumes fuel from the forest's canopy.

On the night of 2 August, an empty train came to Kursha-2. By this point, over 1000 hectares were ablaze and the fire was rapidly intensifying. As the fire intensified, it roared past Koltukhi. As a witness described, 'the forest was not burning, but exploding' and 'it sped through the forest with a tremendous roaring, and its speed was so high that barely anyone managed to escape'. The same source reported fire tornadoes and plumes of black smoke rising to huge heights. Other witnesses reported that the speed of the firestorm was around 30 km/h. But Koltukhi was spared- the field separating the village from the forest stopped the fire from reaching it. That was when the villagers understood that the firestorm was heading straight at Kursha, which was 3 km away and surrounded by pine woodland.

The train crew, which saw the plumes of smoke from a distance on the way from Charus, offered to evacuate children and women from the settlement, but a dispatcher ordered wood be loaded onto the train. This work extended for a few hours, and precious time was lost. The danger only truly became apparent when the firestorm reached the settlement. There were not enough spaces on the train to evacuate all of the panic-stricken settlers, and hundreds were forced to stay at the station. The escapees sat on the carriage couplings, the steam-engine, and the cargo of the wooden logs. Once departed the train reached a bridge across the canal to the north from Kursha-2. They found it already ablaze. As the train attempted to bypass the bridge, it caught fire. The train was trapped and burnt with almost all passengers aboard including cargo while only 29 managed to save themselves. Those who survived ran straight at the wall of fire and escaped with severe burns, while those who stayed at the train and in the ditch bordering the railway were all killed.

Whilst the train disaster unfolded, people who were left behind in Kursha-2 sought ways to save themselves from the fire. Some of them buried themselves in sand, wrapping themselves with a wet blanket. Others hid in wells and in the village pond. Those who hid in wells were killed when the fire swept through the village and were buried under collapsing wood. When the fire moved on, only the village shop was left standing, with 78 survivors in the village, 75 of whom received burns of varying severity. When the fires receded, all that was left was a burnt landscape and dwellings, and charred corpses everywhere.

As the result of the firestorm, 1,200 died including woodcutters (some of which were hired from nearby villages), their families, railwaymen, and soldiers. The fire lost its strength soon after the disaster, when on 4 August there was a downpour in the region.

Initially, the newspaper Novaya Meschera published a note which spoke of 250 dead. On 16 August, a meeting of officials announced the death toll as 313. However, 1,000 graves were recorded as being ordered in Tuma to bury the victims in Kursha-2, but these ran out quickly.

== Aftermath ==
The tragedy was intentionally poorly reported by Soviet media: only a few brief notes were made public; the only reminder of this event was a common grave near the ruins of the locomotive depot. The settlement was restored, but on a smaller scale. Soon after World War II, it was depopulated, the Kursha-Charus railway was dismantled, and thereafter, only foresters lived in Kursha-2. The settlement currently lies in ruins, and the sole resident of the area, as of 2006, was a 90-year-old woman who lost her mother and sisters to the fire and survived by escaping from the burning train with the help of another man into the flames.
