= Mati, Greece =

Mati Mάτι
- Settlement
- Location within Greece
- Coordinates: 38°02′37″N 23°59′42″E
- Country: Greece
- Administrative region: Attica
- Regional unit: East Attica
- Municipality: Marathon
- Municipal unit: Nea Makri

Area
  - Total: 10 km^{2} (3.9 sq mi)
- Highest elevation: 10 m (33 ft)
- Lowest elevation: 0 m (0 ft)

Population (2005)
  - Total: 200
  - Density: 20/km^{2} (52/sq mi)
- Time zone: UTC+2 (EET)
  - Summer (DST): UTC+3 (EEST)
- Postal code: 190 09
- Area code: 2294 0
- Vehicle registration: Y, Z, I

Mati (Greek: Mάτι, meaning "eye") is a village in Greece. The village is located on the east coast of the Attica region, 29 kilometres (18 mi) east of Athens, and it is a popular holiday resort.

== Overview ==
Mati is a popular tourist destination with several hotels, restaurants, taverns, cafés, bars, night clubs, open air cinemas, sandy beaches and yacht marinas. The harbour at the nearby town of Rafina serves as an access point to the Aegean Sea and it is frequently used by tourists to reach many of Greece's numerous islands. The Penteli mountains, which are covered with forests, lie to the west and northwest. Beaches cover the eastern part and restaurants, hotels, and taverns line the shore.

== 2018 wildfire ==
Mati was severely hit by a wildfire on 23 July 2018, which killed 103 people and injured 164. The immediate cause of the fire is thought to have been a man burning brushwood in his back yard. Thousands of vehicles, 4,000 homes, and 40,000 pine and olive trees were burned; the fire destroyed Mati and nearby Kokkino Limanaki. About 400 people waded deep into the sea and waited hours to be rescued. Temperatures reached 800°C, fanned by gale-force winds. People blamed government inaction for the high death toll; the government blamed illegal haphazard house-building. In March 2019 a report was produced detailing many mistakes made by the authorities: mismanagement by police and fire services, and a lack of coordination between rescue agencies, had caused "chaos and a collapse of the system... criminal mistakes and omissions".

The Prime Minister visited Mati weeks after the fire, and promised to create a "model town" within a year. A year later plots remained burned out and the land scorched. Home owners had by then received compensation of up to €6,000, but there was difficulty in getting permission to carry out repair work. Several residents started private court cases against the government.

In August 2021 similar wildfires struck large parts of Greece, following a period of exceptionally high temperatures of up to 47°C.

== Geography ==
Mati lies east of the Penteli mountains, on the Marathonas Avenue north of Rafina and south of Nea Makri. Mati is about 30 km (19 mi) east of downtown Athens.

== Road and sea access ==
The town can be accessed through Marathonos Avenue (EO54) to the west or alternatively via the Dionissos mountains Northwest of Athens.

Mati is closely located to the port of Rafina, which serves as a local hub for holiday ferry boats to the Cyclades islands.

== Panorama view ==
Panorama of Mati showing the harbour in early spring.

== See also ==
- List of municipalities of Attica
