= Nikos Toskas =

Greek military personnel and politician

Lieutenant General Nikolaos Toskas
- Νικόλαος Στεφάνου Τόσκας
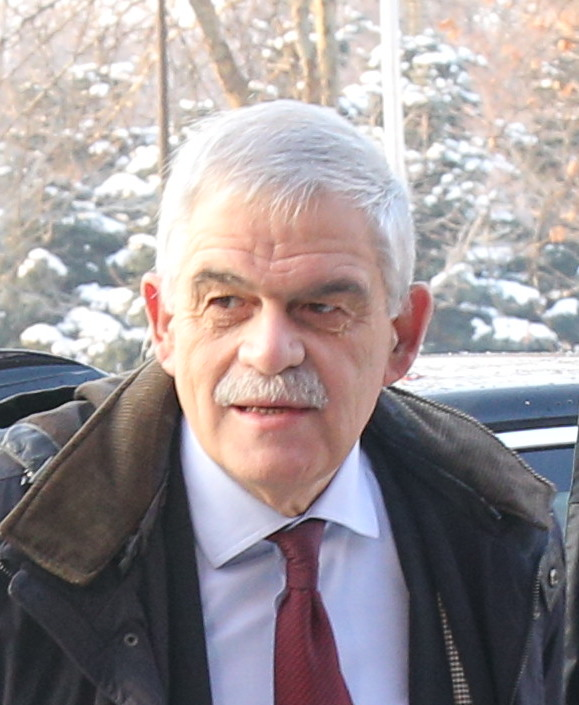
- Nikolaos Toskas in Sofia, January 2018.

Alternate Minister of Public Order and Citizen Protection
- In office 23 September 2015 – 3 August 2018

Deputy Minister of National Defense
- In office 27 January 2015 – September 2015

Member of the Hellenic Parliament
- Incumbent
- Assumed office 25 January 2015
- Constituency: Athens B

Personal details
- Born: 22 February 1952 (age 74) Athens, Kingdom of Greece
- Party: Syriza

Military service
- Allegiance: (Greece) Third Hellenic Republic
- Branch: Hellenic Army
- Years: 1975–2005
- Rank: Lieutenant General

Nikolaos "Nikos" Toskas (Greek: Νικόλαος Στεφάνου Τόσκας) (born 22 February 1952) is a retired Hellenic Army General and a politician currently serving as a Syriza member of the Hellenic Parliament for Athens B. He was Alternate Minister of Public Order and Citizen Protection from 23 September 2015 having previously been Deputy Minister of National Defense. He resigned from office on 3 August 2018.
