= 1901 eastern United States heat wave =

Weather event in the United States

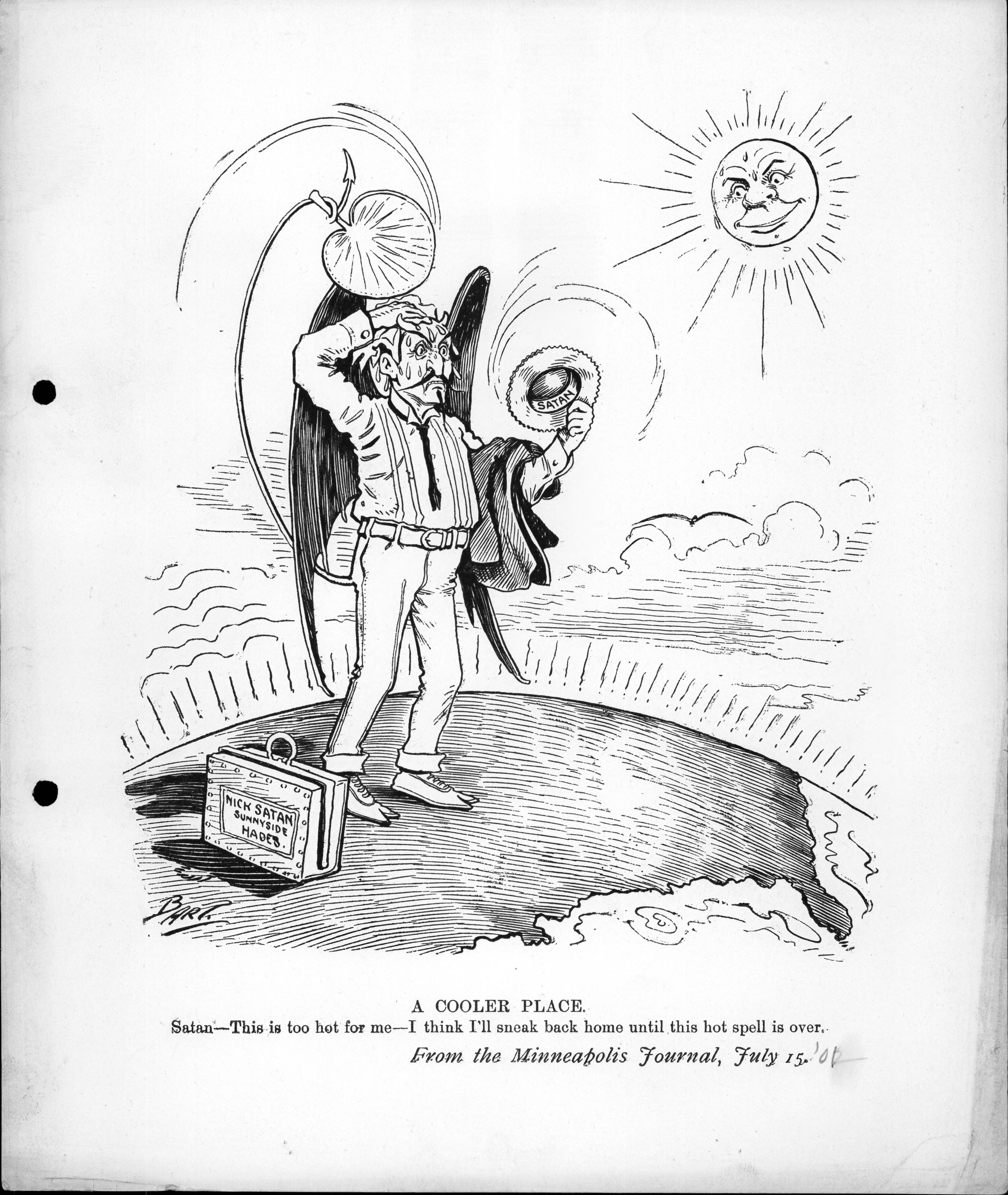
A Cooler Place (July 15, 1901)

The 1901 eastern United States heat wave was the most severe and deadly heat wave in the United States prior to the 1930s Dust Bowl. Although the heat wave did not set many still-standing daily temperature records, it was exceptionally prolonged – covering without interruption the second half of June and all of July – and centered upon more highly populated areas than later American heat waves. The heat wave accompanied a major drought in the Ohio Valley and Upper Midwest, with Illinois recording what remains its driest calendar year since records have been kept, and Missouri receiving only 0.21 inches (5.3 mm) above its driest calendar year of 1953.

== June ==
In spite of frequent nor'easters leading to record heavy rainfall over East Coast states from Massachusetts to South Carolina during April and May, drought had already been developing over the interior. However, only over the sparsely populated far-northern Great Plains was the spring unusually hot.

The heat really set in during the second week of June, when Springfield, Missouri began a sequence of fifty days with a lowest maximum of 83 °F (28 °C) and an average maximum of 93 °F (34 °C). It intensified and spread from June 25, when Philadelphia began twelve consecutive days above 90 °F (32 °C) – a record it did not surpass until 1953. Some days in Philadelphia and nearby Wilmington, Delaware, got as hot as 109 °F (43 °C). As the heat wave spread to New York City – in an era without sanitation or air conditioning – it had by the close of June begun to severely disrupt life. It was documented that by the end of June several deranged inhabitants committed suicide when emotionally disturbed by the hot and still weather, which had risen to a maximum of 95 °F (35 °C) and a minimum of 76 °F (24 °C) by the end of June.

== July ==
July 1901 was the hottest month over the contiguous United States until the 1930s, and is currently surpassed only by the Julys of 1931, 1934, 1936 and 2012. It remains the hottest month on record in Kentucky and West Virginia, and throughout the eastern half, heat was extremely persistent without any cool interval – although a violent tornado hit Inwood on the northern tip of Manhattan with heavy rainfall on the fifth.

With the persistent heat, most horses collapsed, and their carcasses became a source of germs that greatly added to the already high mortality rate in major cities. In one day alone, 250 horses died in New York City, and by the end of July's first week, public streetcars had ceased to run because horses could not be fed. Most factories were closed by the beginning of the month, and those which continued to operate had to permit their workers to wear light gymnastic costumes, as these were the only cooler alternative to the three-piece suits considered polite dress at the time.

As the heat failed to relent over the Ohio Valley and Middle Atlantic states, it spread to the established summer resort of Marquette, Michigan, during the middle of July. On the 14th, Marquette – after staying below 80 °F (27 °C) on all but five days of the heat wave's first month – recorded 108 °F (42 °C), which was 8 °F (4 °C) hotter than ever experienced there before and 6 °F (3 °C) hotter than any temperature recorded since. Then, a week later, without a cool break, the heat intensified further between July 21 and 25, when most of the maximum temperatures of the year were recorded. On the 22nd, Louisville reached 107 °F (42 °C); Chicago, 103 °F (39 °C) with a 77 °F (25 °C) minimum; and Indianapolis, 106 °F (41 °C) with a 78 °F (26 °C) minimum. Farm work was abandoned, and the poorer sections of the population had to rely on canned vegetables for food due to the scarcity of fresh produce.

== Aftermath ==
The heat wave gradually eased at the beginning of August, with temperatures in the Ohio Valley falling to more seasonal levels on August 5, for the first time in over fifty days. Although August was an extremely wet month in the Deep South and along the Atlantic Coast, it was exceptionally dry west and north of the Ohio River.

In the most extensive study of American heat waves, it was estimated that the 1901 Eastern heat wave claimed the lives of 9,500 people, which makes it easily the most destructive disaster of its type in US history.
