= 1931 China floods =

Series of devastating floods

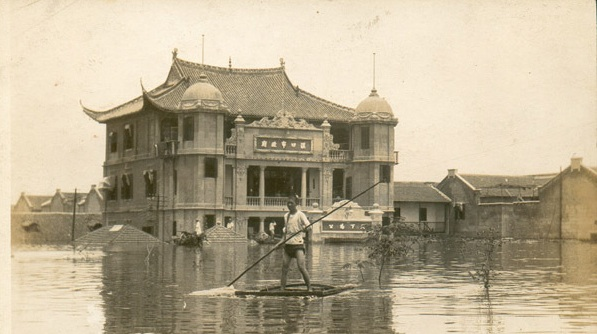
- Hankou city hall during the 1931 flood

Meteorological history
- Duration: July–November 1931 (depending on river)

Overall effects
- Fatalities: 422,499–4,000,000
- Areas affected: (Taiwan) Central and eastern China

The 1931 China floods, or the 1931 Yangtze–Huai River floods, were a series of devastating floods that occurred from June to August 1931 in China, hitting major cities such as Wuhan, Nanjing and beyond, and eventually culminating in a dike breach along Lake Gaoyou on 25 August 1931.

Fatality estimates vary widely. A field survey by the University of Nanking led by John Lossing Buck immediately after the flood found "150,000 people had drowned, and that this number represented less than a quarter of all fatalities during the first 100 days of the flood." The official report found 140,000 drowned and claims that "2 million people died during the flood, having drowned or died from lack of food". A cholera epidemic in the subsequent year, from May 1932, was officially reported to have 31,974 deaths and 100,666 cases.

== Meteorological causes and physical consequences ==
From 1928 to 1931, China was afflicted by a long drought. The subsequent winter of 1930–31 was particularly harsh, creating large deposits of snow and ice in mountainous areas. In early 1931, melting snow and ice flowed downstream and arrived in the middle course of the Yangtze during a period of heavy spring rain. Ordinarily, the region experienced three periods of high water during the spring, summer and autumn, respectively; however, in early 1931, there was a single continuous deluge. By June, those living in low areas had already been forced to abandon their homes. The summer was also characterized by extreme cyclonic activity. In July of that year alone, nine cyclones hit the region, which was significantly above the average of two per year. Four weather stations along the Yangtze River reported rain totaling over 600 mm (24 in) for the month. The water flowing through the Yangtze reached its highest level since record-keeping began in the mid-nineteenth century. That autumn, further heavy rain added to the problem and some rivers did not return to their normal courses until November.

The floods inundated approximately 180,000 square kilometres (69,000 sq mi) – an area equivalent in size to England and half of Scotland, or the states of New York, New Jersey, and Connecticut combined. The high-water mark recorded on 19 August at Hankou in Wuhan showed water levels 16 m (53 ft) above the average, an average of 1.7 m (5.6 ft) above the Shanghai Bund. In Chinese, this event is commonly known as 江淮水灾, which roughly translates to "Yangtze-Huai Flood Disaster". Waterways throughout much of the country were inundated, particularly the Yellow River and Grand Canal. The eight most seriously affected provinces were Anhui, Hubei, Hunan, Jiangsu, Zhejiang, Jiangxi, Henan and Shandong. Beyond the core flood zone, areas as far south as Guangdong, as far north as Manchuria, and as far west as Sichuan were also inundated.

== Death toll and damage ==
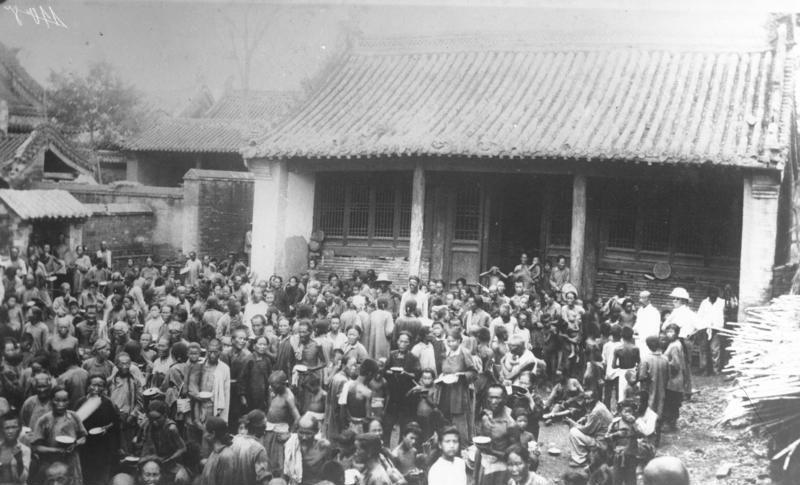
Victims of the flooding in August 1931

This flood is frequently featured in the list of disasters in China by death toll, sometimes topping lists of the world's deadliest natural disasters.

At the time the government estimated that 25 million people had been affected by the flood. Historians since have suggested that the true number may have been as many as 53 million. Estimated death tolls also vary widely. Contemporary studies conducted by John Lossing Buck allege that at least 150,000 people had drowned in the first few months of the flood, with hundreds of thousands more dying of starvation and disease over the following year. Using contemporary media reports, Chinese historians led by Li Wenhai have calculated the death toll at 422,420. Some Western sources allege that the death toll was between 3.7 and 4 million people based on their own claims of famine and disease. The Tanka people who traditionally live on boats along the Yangtze suffered greatly from the flooding.

The flood destroyed vast swaths of housing and farmland. Throughout the entire Yangtze Valley, around 15% of the wheat and rice crops were destroyed, with the proportion being much higher in the flood-affected areas. The disaster also caused an economic shock with the price of vital commodities rising rapidly. The combined ecological and economic impacts of the disaster caused many areas to descend into famine. With no food, people were reduced to eating tree bark, weeds, and earth. Some sold their children to survive, while others resorted to cannibalism. The most lethal effect of the flood was the diseases that swept through the refugee population due to displacement, overcrowding, and the breakdown of sanitation. These included cholera, measles, malaria, dysentery, and schistosomiasis.

As well as inundating rural areas, the flood caused widespread destruction to a number of cities. Refugees had been arriving in the city of Wuhan since the late spring. When the city itself was inundated in the early summer and after a catastrophic dike failure at just before 6:00 AM on 27 July, around 782,189 urban citizens and rural refugees were left homeless. The flood covered an area of 83 square kilometres (32 sq mi) and the city was flooded under many feet of water for close to three months. Large numbers gathered on flood islands throughout the city, with 30,000 sheltering on a railway embankment in central Hankou. With little food and a complete breakdown in sanitation, thousands soon began to succumb to diseases.

There was no warning, only a sudden great wall of water. Most of Wuhan's buildings in those days were only one story high, and for many people there was no escape- they died by the tens of thousands. ... I was just coming off duty at the company's main office, a fairly new three-story building near the center of town ... When I heard the terrible noise and saw the wall of water coming, I raced to the top story of the building. ... I was in one of the tallest and strongest buildings left standing. At that time no one knew whether the water would subside or rise even higher.

— Jin Shilong, Senior Engineer at the Hubei Flood Prevention Agency,

The city of Nanjing, then the capital of Republican China, was also severely affected by the disaster. One of the most disastrous single events during the flood occurred on 25 August 1931, when the water rushing through the Grand Canal washed away dikes near Gaoyou Lake. In Gaoyou County alone, 18,000 people drowned and 58,000 died due to famine and diseases the following year.

== Rebuilding of dikes at Lake Gaoyou ==
Thomas Harnsberger, a missionary of the Presbyterian Church in Taizhou, Jiangsu, was one of the two central figures (alongside General Wang Shuxiang, a PhD in hydraulics) who supervised the rebuilding of the dikes at Lake Gaoyou, as well as securing the funds for it. However, the flood remains widely unknown to the Chinese. Steve Harnsberger, the grandson of Thomas Harnsberger, wrote in 2007, "The 1931 flood killed 15 times the number of people lost in the Indonesian tsunamis of December 2004, and yet scarcely a word has been written of it. History focused instead on other disasters that year. China's attention was on a civil war between the Communists and Nationalists and the Japanese were invading in the North, while the world was deep into the Great Depression."

== Government reactions ==
=== Republican Era (1930s–1940s) ===
The 1931 flood was one of the first major tests for the Kuomintang Government. As the scale of the disaster became apparent, the government established the National Flood Relief Commission under the auspices of T.V. Soong, a prominent politician in the Kuomintang and brother-in-law of Chiang Kai-shek. The commission employed a range of Chinese and foreign experts, including figures such as famous epidemiologist Wu Liande, health minister Liu Ruiheng, public health worker John Grant, and hydraulic engineer Oliver Todd. It also secured the assistance of the League of Nations. Even the famous aviators Charles Lindbergh and his wife Anne Lindbergh became involved, as they were commissioned to conduct an aerial survey of the flood zone. Although Song Ziwen remained the head of the commission, the day-to-day running the relief effort was entrusted to John Hope Simpson, a British refugee expert. Charity poured in to help with the relief effort from throughout the world, with overseas Chinese communities in Southeast Asia being particularly generous. In the United States, the celebrated author Pearl Buck wrote short stories to encourage charitable donations. The relief effort became much more difficult following the Japanese invasion of Manchuria in the autumn of 1931, which caused the Chinese bond market to collapse. Eventually, the government managed to secure a large loan of wheat and flour from the United States. In the wake of the disaster, the government set up organizations such as the Huai River Conservancy Commission to address flood problems. However, due to a lack of funding and the chaos of the Second Sino-Japanese War and the subsequent Chinese Civil War, the various commissions were only able to construct small dams along the Yangtze River.

As part of an anti-superstition campaign by the Kuomintang Government, a Dragon King Temple was demolished in Wuhan shortly before the flood-hit. This coincidence led to widespread discontent afterwards, as many locals linked the disaster to the anger of Dragon King, a rainmaking deity. As a response, prominent officials, including He Baohua, mayor of Wuhan, and Xia Douyin, then the local garrison commander and later governor of Hubei Province, held ritual ceremonies and kowtowed to the deity. Meanwhile, many believed that evacuation efforts were hindered by superstition. According to a contemporary report, thousands "are convinced that Hankow is doomed and refuse to help themselves or be helped. They sit stoically awaiting death."

=== Communist Era (1949–present) ===
In 1953, after the end of the Chinese Civil War, Chinese Communist Party leader Mao Zedong travelled to areas neighbouring the Yangtze River to promote the Three Gorges Dam flood control project. "The Socialist Three Gorges Dam project should excel other major projects in Chinese history such as Qin Shi Huang's Great Wall and Sui Yang Di's Grand Canal", he stated.

Scientists and officials who raised doubts, such as Chen Mingshu, were persecuted as rightists. Li Siguang, a prominent scientist and minister of geological resources, told Mao he would commit suicide if he could not stop the construction of the dam. The project did not move beyond the planning stage in Mao's time, due to a lack of resources, rising Sino-Soviet tensions and the disruptions of the Great Leap Forward. The project was restarted in the 1980s, and the hydroelectric Three Gorges Dam began full operation in 2012, becoming the world's largest power station in terms of installed capacity.

== See also ==
- List of disasters in China by death toll
- Cannibalism in Asia
