= Tiger (disambiguation) =

The tiger (Panthera tigris) is the largest cat species.

Tiger or tigers may also refer to:

== Other animals ==
- Smilodon, commonly known as the saber-tooth tiger, an extinct genus
- Thylacine, commonly known as the Tasmanian tiger, an extinct marsupial
- Danaini, sometimes known as tiger butterflies
- Arctiinae, commonly known as tiger moths
- Tigerfish, refers to various fish families
- Tiger shark, refers to a species of ground shark
- Tiger snake, refers to a species of highly venomous snake from Australia

== Arts, entertainment, and media ==
=== Characters ===
- Great Tiger, fictional boxer from Nintendo's Punch-Out!! series
- Tiger (comics), the name of several characters
- Tiger (dog), animal actor in the TV series The Brady Bunch and the film A Boy and His Dog
- Tiger Jackson, from the video game series Tekken
- Tiger Ow, in the Jackie Chan film Project A Part II
- Satoru Tojo or Tiger, from the Kamen Rider Ryuki Japanese TV series
- Tiger, from An American Tail films
- Tiger, from Ibn-e-Safi's Imran series
- Tiger (YRF Spy Universe), played by Salman Khan in the Tiger franchise of Indian films (see below)
- Tiger, played by Amitabh Bachchan in the 1994 Indian film Hum
- Tiger Gleeson, from Australian series Round the Twist
- Tiger Tanaka, an ally of James Bond in the film You Only Live Twice
- The Tiger, a villain in Meet the Tiger by Leslie Charteris
- The Tigers, a group of bullies from the Encyclopedia Brown books
- The Tigers, a group of businessmen on Japanese television series Manē no Tora

=== Films ===
- The Tiger (1978 film), a Yugoslav film
- Tiger (1979 film), a Telugu film
- The Tigers (film), a 1991 Hong Kong action film
- Tiger, a 1997 film by Serge Rodnunsky
- Indra: The Tiger, a 2002 Indian Hindi language release of the Telegu-language Indra
- The Tiger (2005 film), an Indian Malayalam-language film
- Tigers (2014 film), an Indian film
- Tiger (2015 film), a Telugu film
- The Tiger: An Old Hunter's Tale, a 2015 South Korean film
- Tiger (2017 film), an Indian Kannada film
- Tiger (2018 film), an American film starring Mickey Rourke
- Tigers (2020 film), a Swedish-Italian-Danish sports drama
- Tiger (2024 film), a Disneynature film distributed by Disney+
- Tiger (2025 film), a Japanese film
- The Tiger (2025 film), a German film

=== Music ===
==== Bands ====
- Tiger (1970s band), formerly Crushed Butler, 1970s proto-punk band
- Tiger (band), late-1990s indie rock band
- The Tigers (Japanese band), 1960s Japanese rock band
- The Tigers (New Zealand band), 1980s New Zealand band
- Tiger Band (disambiguation), several university marching bands

==== Albums ====
- Tiger (Frank Buck album), 1950 children's record
- Tiger (Superette album), 1996
- Tigers (album), by The Dance Party, 2009
- ส (Tiger), by Thaiboy Digital, 2014

==== Songs ====
- "Tiger" (ABBA song), 1976
- "Tiger" (Fabian song), 1959
- "Tiger" (Steve Angello song), 2015
- "Tiger", a song by Mike McGear from the 1972 album Woman
- "Tiger", a song by Neil Cicierega from Mouth Moods

==== Other uses in music ====
- The Tigers (opera), by Havergal Brian

=== Literature ===
- Tiger (comic strip) (1965–2003), an American comic
- Tiger (Fleetway) (1954–1985), a British comic
- The Tiger, a 2010 book by John Vaillant
- Harimau! Harimau! (translated as Tiger!), a 1975 novel by Mochtar Lubis

=== Publications ===
- Tiger (magazine) (1956–1990s), an American men's magazine
- The Tiger (political magazine), a Chinese publication
- The Tiger (newspaper), an American student newspaper

=== Television ===
- Tiger (TV series), a 1990s Indian detective soap opera
- Tiger (miniseries), a 2021 two-part HBO miniseries on the life of Tiger Woods
- "The Tiger" (Fargo), an episode of the American television series Fargo
- "Tiger", a season 3 episode of Servant (TV series)

=== Other uses in arts, entertainment and media ===
- Tiger (franchise), an Indian spy media franchise by Yash Raj Films (YRF), expanded into the YRF Spy Universe
- Tiger (guitar), used by Jerry Garcia
- Tiger (video game) or Destiny, a multiplayer first-person shooter video game released in 2014

== Business ==
- Tiger Aircraft, an American aircraft manufacturer
- Tiger Airways, or Tigerair, a regional airline based in Singapore
- Tiger Aspect Productions, also Tiger Television, a British TV production company
- Tiger Beer, a brand of Heineken Asia Pacific
- Tiger Brands, a South African packaged goods company
- Tiger Corporation, a Japanese small appliance maker
- Tiger Electronics, an American toy manufacturer
- Tiger Inn, a Princeton University club
- Tiger Line, a British local bus service
- Tiger Resources, an Australia-based mining company
- Tiger Telematics, a Swedish electronics company
- Flying Tiger Copenhagen, formerly Tiger, a Danish variety store
- Tigers, part of Cub Scouting

== Military ==
=== Aircraft ===
- Eurocopter Tiger, a European attack helicopter
- Grumman F-11 Tiger, a U.S. Navy fighter of the 1950s and 1960s
- Northrop F-5 Tiger II, an American supersonic light fighter

=== Land vehicles ===
- Tiger I, a German World War II heavy tank
- Tiger II, the successor of the Tiger I
- VK 45.01 (P), also informally known as the Tiger (P) or Porsche Tiger, the losing design for the Tiger I
- Geschützwagen Tiger, a German self-propelled gun carrier of World War II that never saw service

=== Ships ===
- HMS Tiger
- Tiger-class cruiser, the last cruiser class of the Royal Navy
- Tiger-class fast attack craft, a post-World War II class of Bundesmarine (German Federal Navy) fast attack craft
- German torpedo boat Tiger (1928), a Type 24 torpedo boat launched in 1928 and sunk in a collision in 1939
- German torpedo boat Tiger (1940), the Norwegian destroyer HNoMS Tor captured by Germany in 1940 and renamed Tiger
- SMS Tiger (1887), a torpedo ram cruiser of the Austro-Hungarian Navy
- USCGC Tiger, an American coast guard patrol boat

=== Units ===
- Tiger Division (disambiguation)
- Tiger Force (disambiguation)
- Tigers Militia, the military wing of the National Liberal Party during the Lebanese Civil War
- Tiger Squad, a Saudi Arabian death squad implicated consisting of police and military personnel
- Flying Tigers, the 1st American Volunteer Group of the Chinese Air Force
- 3rd Division, nicknamed "Tigers"
- 152d Fighter Squadron, Arizona Air National Guard, nicknamed "Tigers"
- Royal Leicestershire Regiment, a British Army infantry regiment, nicknamed "Tigers"
- Serb Volunteer Guard, a paramilitary organisation, nicknamed "Tigers"
- Tiger Forces, a Syrian Arab Army special forces unit
- The Tigers, nickname of the Princess of Wales's Royal Regiment
- The Tigers, aerobatic display team of No. 74 Squadron RAF
- Liberation Tigers of Tamil Eelam, or Tamil Tigers, in Sri Lanka
- Special Operations Unit (North Macedonia), special police unit from North Macedonia
- Tiger Legion, nickname of the Indian Legion

=== Other military uses ===
- Operation Tiger (disambiguation)

== People ==
- Tiger (surname), a list of people with the surname
- Tiger (nickname), a list of people
- Tiger Palpatja (c. 1920–2012), Australian Aboriginal artist
- Tiger Varadachariar (1876–1950), Carnatic music vocalist
- Big Tiger, Principal Chief of the council of a dissident group of Cherokee, 1824–1828
- Tiger (musician), Jamaican dancehall musician Norman Washington Jackson (born 1960)
- Tiger (wrestler), a ring name of a Mexican professional wrestler (born 1987)
- Tiger Ali Singh and Tiger Jeet Singh, Jr., ring names of Indo-Canadian professional wrestler Gurjit Singh Hans (born 1971)
- Tiger Jeet Singh (born 1944), ring name of an Indo-Canadian wrestler and father of Tiger Ali Singh

== Places ==
- Tiger, Arizona, U.S., a ghost town
- Tiger, Colorado, U.S., a ghost town
- Tiger, Georgia, U.S., a town
- Tiger, Washington, U.S., an unincorporated community
- Tiger Inn, Driffield, a pub in the East Riding of Yorkshire, England
- The Tiger Inn, a pub in North Newbald, East Riding of Yorkshire, England
- 19 Market Street, a former pub called Tiger in York, North Yorkshire, England
- Tiger Cave (disambiguation)
- Tiger Creek (disambiguation)
- Tiger Lake (disambiguation)
- Tiger Mountain (disambiguation)

== Science, technology and mathematics ==
- Mac OS X Tiger, an Apple operating system
- Tiger (hash function), in cryptography
- Tiger (security software), a Unix security tool
- Tiger, a 2004 version of the Java Platform, Standard Edition
- Tiger, a line of automatic test equipment produced by Teradyne

== Sports ==
- Tigers (sports teams), various sports teams
- Tiger Cup, an association football tournament now known as the AFF Championship
- The Tiger (mascot), of the athletic teams of Clemson University, South Carolina, U.S.

== Transportation ==
=== Land ===
- Leyland Tiger (front-engined), a bus and coach chassis (1927–1968)
- Leyland Tiger, a bus and coach chassis (1981–1992)
- Sunbeam Tiger, a sports car (1964–1967)
- Sunbeam Tiger (1925), a racing car
- Tiger (automobile), a 1914 cycle-car built in Detroit, Michigan
- Tiger Truck, a Chinese light utility truck
- Toyota Tiger, version of sixth generation Toyota Hilux light commercial vehicles
- Triumph Tiger, various motorcycles
- Tiger, a South Devon Railway Eagle class locomotive
- Tiger, a GWR Firefly Class locomotive

=== Sea ===
- List of ships named Tiger
- Tiger 25, a British sailboat design

=== Air ===
- Siddeley Tiger, an unsuccessful post-First World War British aero engine
- Tiger, two models of the Grumman American AA-5 light aircraft

== Other uses ==
- Tiger (zodiac), one of the animals in the Chinese zodiac
- Transportation Investment Generating Economic Recovery (TIGER), a federal stimulus program in the American Recovery and Reinvestment Act of 2009
- Topologically Integrated Geographic Encoding and Referencing (TIGER), a mapping format used by the U.S. Census Bureau
- NATO Tiger Association, whose goal is to promote solidarity between NATO air forces
- Tiger (organisation), a Russian-based opposition pressure group
- The Tigers (action figures), 1965 toys by Topper Toys

== See also ==
- Liger, a hybrid offspring of a male lion and a female tiger
- Tiger economy
- Tony the Tiger (disambiguation)
- Tiger Tiger (disambiguation)
- Big Tiger and Little Tiger, non-standard poker hands
- Taiga (disambiguation)
- The Tiger Woman (1944 film), an American movie
- Tiga (disambiguation)
- Tigar (disambiguation)
- Tigger, a character from Winnie-the-Pooh
- Tigr (Russian military vehicle)
- Tigra (disambiguation)
- Tigre (disambiguation)
- Tiger 1 (disambiguation)
- Tiger 2 (disambiguation)
- Two Tigers (nursery rhyme)
- Tyger (disambiguation)
