= Tigr =

Tigr may refer to:

== Vehicular ==
- Tigr (Russian military vehicle), a Russian 4×4 high-mobility multi-purpose military vehicle developed by GAZ and made by VPK
- UAZ Tigr, a Soviet jeep, military offroad light utility vehicle made by UAZ

== Biology ==
- The Institute for Genomic Research (TIGR), now a part of the J. Craig Venter Institute
  - TIGR plant transcript assembly database
  - TIGR plant repeat database
- Trabecular meshwork inducible glucocorticoid response (TIGR) or MYOC, a human gene
- Tandem interspaced guide RNA-associated protein (TIGR-Tas), a DNA-targeting system similar to CRISPR-Cas

== Other uses ==
- TIGR (Trst, Istra, Gorica, Reka), an Italian anti-Fascist insurgent organization, active in the 1920 and 1930s
- Tradable Instrument for Global Renewables (TIGR), a type of energy certificate

== See also ==
- Tiger (disambiguation)
- Tigre (disambiguation)
- Tigra (disambiguation)
- TIGRS
