= Tiger Lake (disambiguation) =

Tiger Lake is an Intel microprocessor.

Tiger Lake may also refer to:

- Tiger Lake (Carver County, Minnesota), US
- Tiger Lake (Redwood County, Minnesota), US
- Tiger Lake, Shuzheng Valley, Jiuzhaigou, China
- Tiger Lake, or Pilikula Nisargadhama, Mangalore, India
- Tiger Lake, a habitat at Africam Safari, Mexico

== See also ==
- Tiger (disambiguation)
