= Taiga (disambiguation) =

Taiga is a biome characterized by coniferous forests.

Taiga may also refer to:

== Places ==
- Tayga, a town in Kemerovo Oblast, Russia, also known as "Taiga"

== Arts and entertainment ==
=== Fictional characters ===
- Taiga (タイガ), a character from Kamen Rider Ryuki
- Taiga Aisaka (逢坂 大河), a female character from Toradora!
- Taiga Fujimura (藤村 大河), a character from Fate/stay night
- Taiga Hanaya (花家 大我), a character from Kamen Rider Ex-Aid
- Taiga Kagami (火神 大我), a character from Kuroko's Basketball
- Taiga Okajima (岡島 大河), a character from Assassination Classroom
- Taiga Saejima (冴島 大河), a character from Garo
- Taiga Saejima (冴島 大河), a character from Yakuza
- Taiga Hoshibami (星喰大我), a character from Tokyo Debunker

=== Film and television ===
- Taiga (1958 film), a German film
- Taiga (1992 film), a 1992 documentary
- Taiga drama, a series of year-long Japanese historical TV dramas
- Ultraman Taiga, a 2019 tokusatsu series

=== Music ===
- Taiga (OOIOO album), 2006
- Taiga (Zola Jesus album), 2014
- Taiga, musician Bryant Clifford Meyer's solo project

== People ==
- Ike no Taiga (池 大雅; 1723–1776), a Japanese painter
- Taiga Hasegawa (長谷川 帝勝, born 2005), a Japanese snowboarder
- Taiga Ishiura (石浦 大雅; born 2001), a Japanese footballer
- Taiga Kawabe (河部 大雅; born 1996), a Japanese kickboxer
- Taiga Nakano (仲野 太賀; born 1993), a Japanese actor
- Taiga Nishiyama (西山 大雅; born 1999), a Japanese footballer
- Taiga Satoru (大峩 悟; 1950–2009), a Japanese sumo wrestler

== Other uses ==
- Taiga (project management), open source software
- Taiga nuclear test, on the potential route of Pechora–Kama Canal in Russia in 1971
- Taïga, a beer by Belgh Brasse
- Taiga, a leather line by Louis Vuitton
- IZh-94 "Taiga", a Russian combination gun
- Taiga Motors, an electric snowmobile manufacturer based in Montreal, Canada
- Taiga (roller coaster), a ride at the Linnanmäki amusement park in Helsinki, Finland
- TAIGA, an expired trademark for a prepress workflow product by Dainippon Screen
- TAIGA, an outdoor equipment brand based in Vancouver.

== See also ==
- Tiger (disambiguation)
- Bentley Bentayga, an SUV named after portmanteau of Bentley and Taiga
- Ergak-Targak-Taiga, a mountain range in Eastern Siberia
- Taigā Mahōbin Kabushiki Gaisha, or Tiger Corporation
- Ulaan Taiga, a mountain range in Mongolia
- Tyga, an American rapper
