= List of ships named Tiger =

Numerous ships have been named Tiger after the tiger:

== Naval ==
- HMS Tiger - one of 15 vessels of the British Royal Navy by that name
- SMS Tiger (1887), a torpedo ram cruiser of the Austro-Hungarian Navy
- SS Tiger (1917) was a tanker that was torpedoed on 1 April 1942 off the coast of Virginia during World War II
- German torpedo boat Tiger (1928), a Type 24 torpedo boat launched in 1928 and sunk in a collision in 1939
- German torpedo boat Tiger (1940), the Norwegian destroyer HNoMS Tor captured by Germany in 1940 and renamed Tiger

== Commercial ==
- Tiger (1773 ship) was launched at Maryland. She was lengthened in 1779. Between 1785 and 1788 she was a whaler in the Southern Whale Fishery. She was last listed in 1795.
- Tiger (1800 ship) was launched at Liverpool. She made one voyage as a slave ship (1806-7), and was wrecked in 1819.
- Tiger, of 189 tons (bm), was launched in Scotland in 1800. She was lost in 1816 near Pernambuco, Brazil. She was on a voyage from London to Rio de Janeiro. Agreeable took her cargo into Rio de Janeiro.
- Tiger (1813 ship), of 32768/94 tons (bm), was built in America and captured by the British, probably by HMS Medusa. Tiger was condemned in prize on 4 May 1813. She is last listed in 1833.
- Tiger, of 375 tons (bm), was launched in 1835 or 1836. She was wrecked on 12 August 1836 on Astorva Island, Seychelles, on passage from London for Bombay, or Calcutta. All 26 people on board survived. Later, a shark killed one of them; 14 sailed to seek another island from where rescue could be arranged, and disappeared without a trace. The whaler Emma rescued the remaining 11 people 70 days after the shipwreck.

== See also ==
- HMS Tigre
- French ship Tigre - ships of the French Navy by that name
- Tiger-class cruiser, the last cruiser class of the Royal Navy
- Tiger-class fast attack craft, a post-World War II class of Bundesmarine (German Federal Navy) fast attack craft
