= Oblique subduction =

Tectonic process

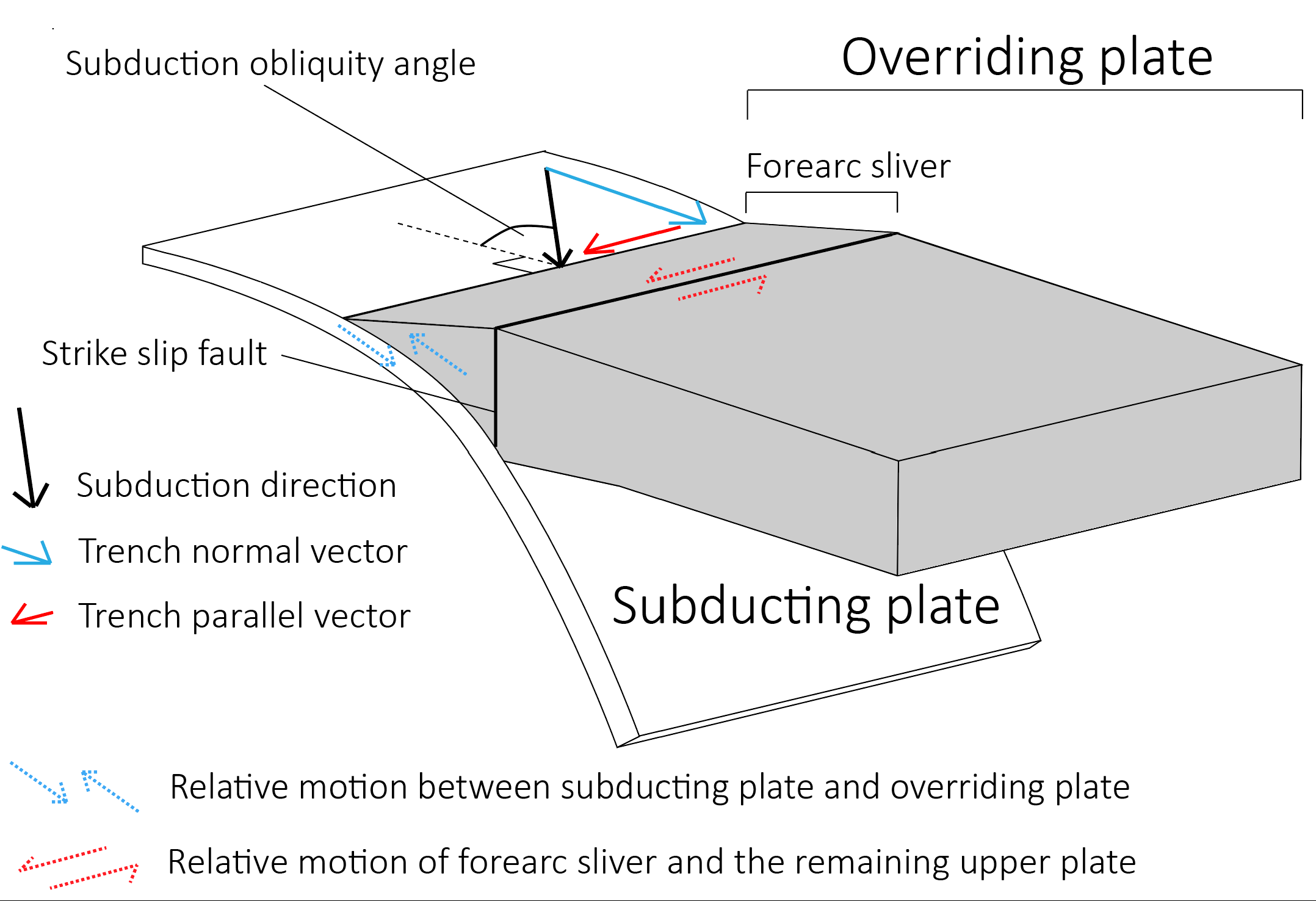
Simplified model of oblique subduction. The oblique subduction motion is composed of motion vectors that are parallel and orthogonal to plate boundary. The obliquity of plate convergence is compensated by the relative motion between forearc sliver and the remaining overriding plate. In this way, the relative motion between the overriding plate and the subducting plate is almost perpendicular to the plate boundary. Adapted from Westbrook, 2005.

Oblique subduction is a form of subduction (i.e. a tectonic process involving the convergence of two plates where the denser plate descends into Earth's interior) for which the convergence direction differs from 90° to the plate boundary. Most convergent boundaries involve oblique subduction, particularly in the Ring of Fire including the Ryukyu, Aleutian, Central America and Chile subduction zones. In general, the obliquity angle is between 15° and 30°. Subduction zones with high obliquity angles include Sunda trench (ca. 60°) and Ryukyu arc (ca. 50°).

Obliquity in plate convergence causes differences in dipping angle and subduction velocity along the plate boundary. Tectonic processes including slab roll-back, trench retreat (i.e. a tectonic response to the process of slab roll-back that moves the trench seaward) and slab fold (i.e. buckling of subducting slab due to phase transition) may also occur.

Moreover, collision of two plates leads to strike slip deformation of the forearc, thus forming a series of features including forearc slivers and strike slip fault systems that are sub-parallel to ocean trenches. In addition, oblique subduction is associated with the closure of ancient ocean, tsunami and block rotations in several regions.

== Deformation features ==
=== Forearc slivers ===
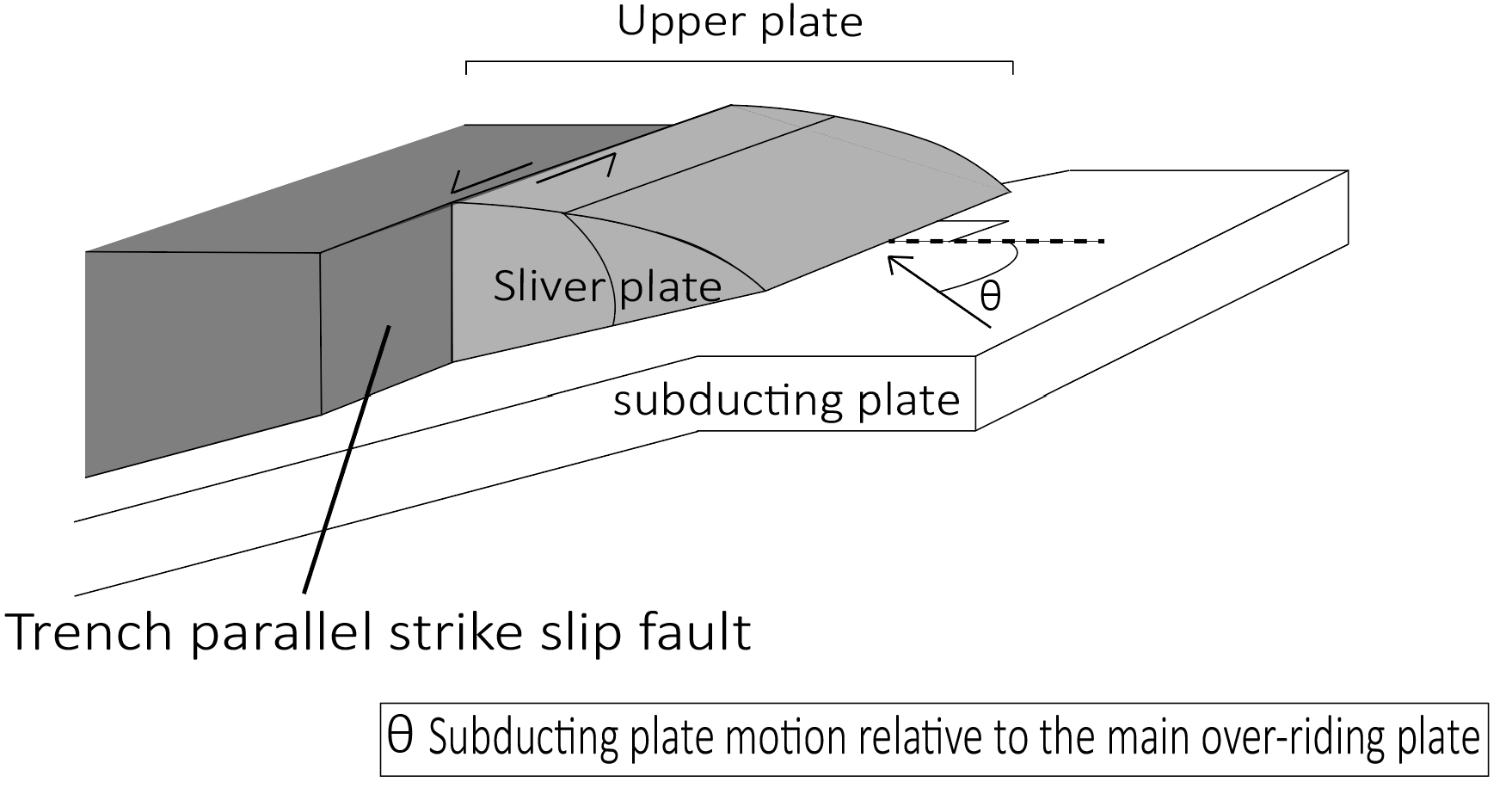
Oblique subduction model with the development of forearc sliver and margin parallel strike slip fault. Forearc sliver is a microplate bounded by the oceanic trench and strike slip fault. Trench parallel strike slip fault develops when the forearc sliver moves away from stable continent. Adapted from Haq and Davis, 2010.

Forearc slivers are partly detached continental blocks of the overriding plates. They are bounded by the trenches and trench parallel strike slip fault systems. The motion of forearc slivers depend on the obliquity of the subducting slabs.

Moreover, some forearc slivers occur in the absence of well defined strike-slip fault systems, and sliver motions are not purely strike-slip.

=== Trench parallel strike-slip fault systems ===
Trench parallel strike-slip faults are deformational products contributed by trench parallel component of strain partitioning. They are located between the forearc slivers and the remaining overriding plates.

Examples of trench parallel strike slip fault
Fault	Subducting plate	Overriding plate	Strike slip motion	Motion rate
Philippine Fault	Philippine Sea Plate	Sunda Plate	Left-lateral motion	20–25 mm per year
Japan Median Tectonic Line	Philippine Sea Plate	Eurasian Plate	Right-lateral motion	5 mm per year
Liquiñe-Ofqui Fault	Nazca Plate	South American Plate	Right-lateral motion	6.8–28 mm per year

==== Orientation of strike slip faults ====
Vertical strike slip fault systems are generally accepted by the early literature of oblique subduction. However, modern technology, such as seismic profiling, reveals that the faults are not necessarily vertical. Several other models concerning the orientations of the faults are proposed.

Three hypothetical models of strike slip fault systems
Hypothetical models	Figures	Description
Vertical fault model	A vertical strike slip fault model. The red line indicates the vertical fault. The fault extends from surface down to the subducting slab.	During oblique subduction, the convergence and coupling between two plates create horizontal shear stress on the overriding plate. Early studies suggested that horizontal shear is likely to concentrate in vertical planes. Together with the field measurements on seismicity. The trench parallel strike slip fault is thought to be vertical from earth surface down to the subducting plate.
Mega-splay fault system model	A mega splay fault system model. The strike slip fault is suggested to be one of the branches in the mega splay fault, which also links thrust faults in the forearc. The mega splay fault is subparallel to the subducting plate at depth. Modified from Tsuji et al., 2014.	In Nankai Trough (Formed by oblique subduction of the Philippine Sea Plate), seismic profiles reveal that the margin parallel strike slip fault and thrust structures are linked by the mega splay fault system, which align in a parallel manner with the subducting plate (i.e. Philippine Sea Plate).
Curved fault model	A curved strike slip fault model. Adapted from Ormeño. et al., 2017	The Liquiñe-Ofqui Fault is a trench parallel dextral strike-slip fault in Andes. Based on analysis on shear stress distribution, Ormeño et al., (2017) suggested that it is a curving strike slip fault. The hypothetical geometry coincides with an curving reflector obtained in the seismic reflection profile of the subduction zone.

=== Slip accommodating mechanisms ===
Trench parallel slip component from oblique subduction may not be fully accommodated by the aforementioned trench parallel strike slip faults. Several models suggest that there are other slip accommodating mechanisms formed by oblique subduction as means to take up the remaining slip component.

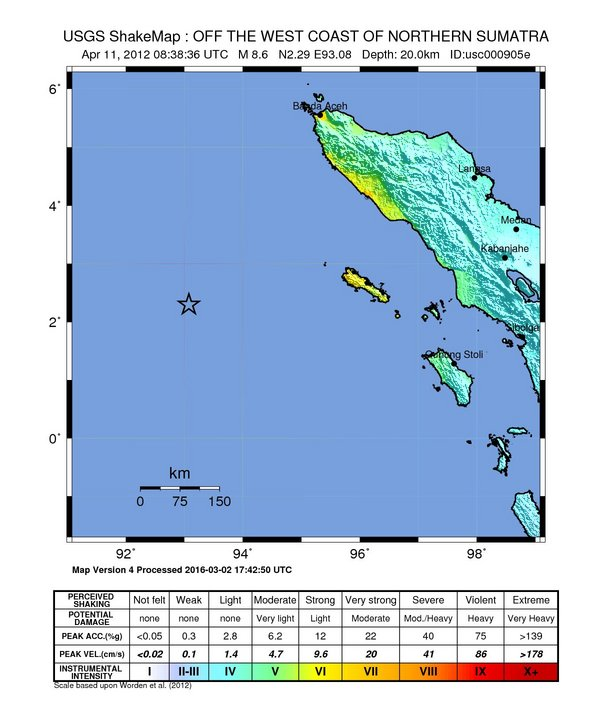
USGS map of the 2012 M_{w} 8.6 earthquake in Indian Ocean. The star represents the location of epicentre. Adapted from USGS, 2012

==== Margin parallel strike-slip faults in subducting plates ====
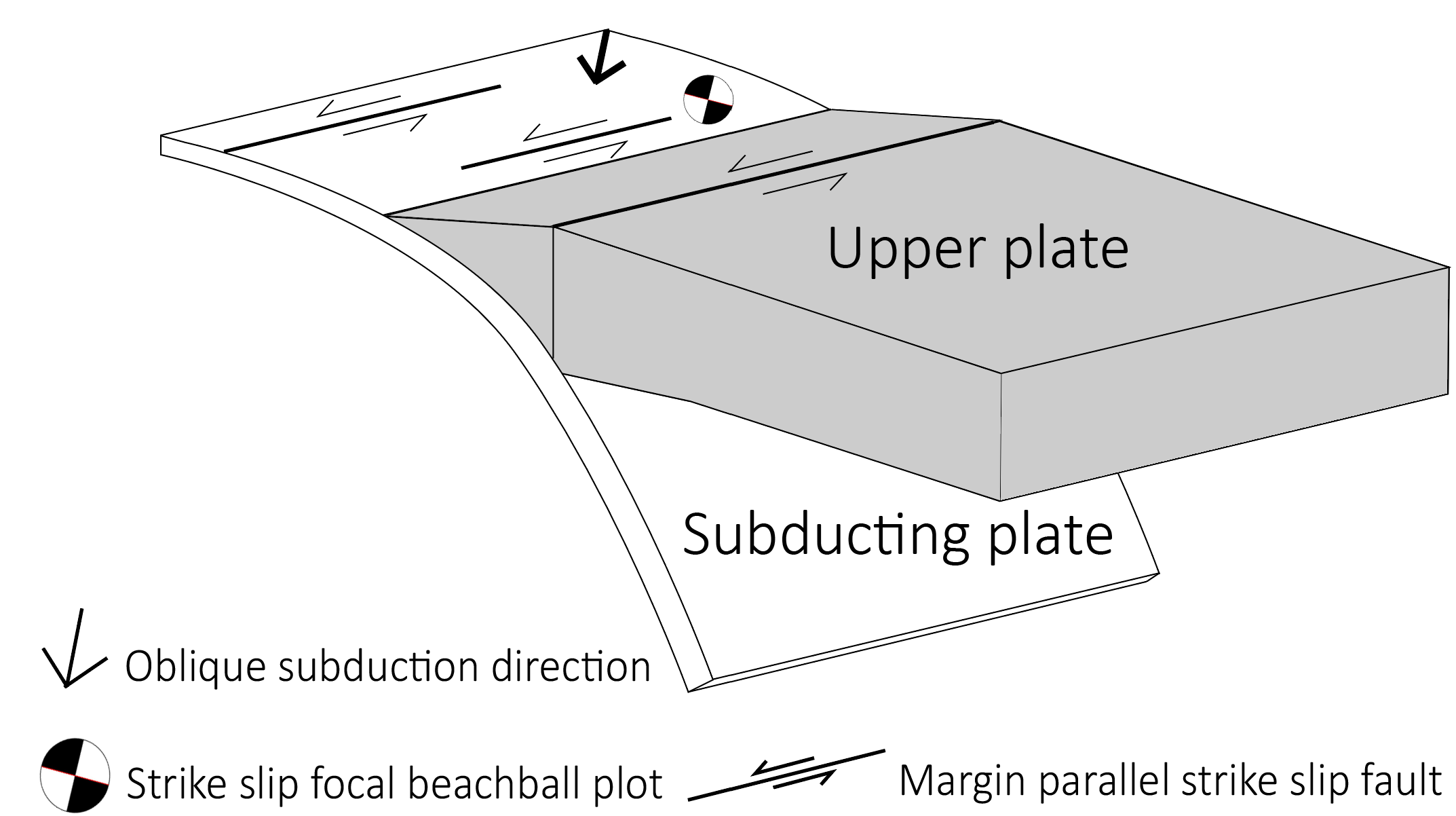
Model of trench parallel strike slip fault in subducting slab. Trench parallel component in this setting is accommodated by strike slip faults both in the upper plate and the outer trench region of the sinking slab. Adapted from Ishii et al., 2013.

Ishii et al., (2013) suggested that the trench parallel strike-slip faults may appear in the obliquely subducting slabs to accommodate a portion of the trench parallel slip component.

In the Sumatra subduction zone, the trench parallel slip component is measured to be approximately 45 mm per year, the motion rate of northern Great Sumatra Fault ranges from 1 to 9 mm per year with the maximum rate of 13 mm per year. The result shows that the trench parallel slip component of at least 32 mm per year is left.

On 11 April 2012, a M_{w} 8.6 earthquake occurred in the subducting plate (i.e. the Indo-Australian Plate). Strike-slip seismicity was recorded in the earthquake. This infers strike slip fault systems are present in the descending slab and they may potentially accommodate slip component from oblique subduction.

Comparison between trench parallel strike slip faults
Location of faults	Features
Upper plate	Remain active for a long period of time
Subducting plate	Disappear after being subducted; Continuous migration

== Strain partitioning ==
Strain partitioning is a form of deformation. In oblique subduction zone, strain partitioning is initiated into trench parallel component and trench normal component. The trench parallel component is accommodated by localized shear zones (short-term deformation) or trench parallel strike slip fault systems (long-term deformation) in the overriding plates. Likewise, this component commonly leads to the formation of forearc slivers. The trench normal component is taken up by thrust structures. These thrusts are generally discontinuous and their geometries change progressively.

=== Short-term deformation: Localized shear zone ===
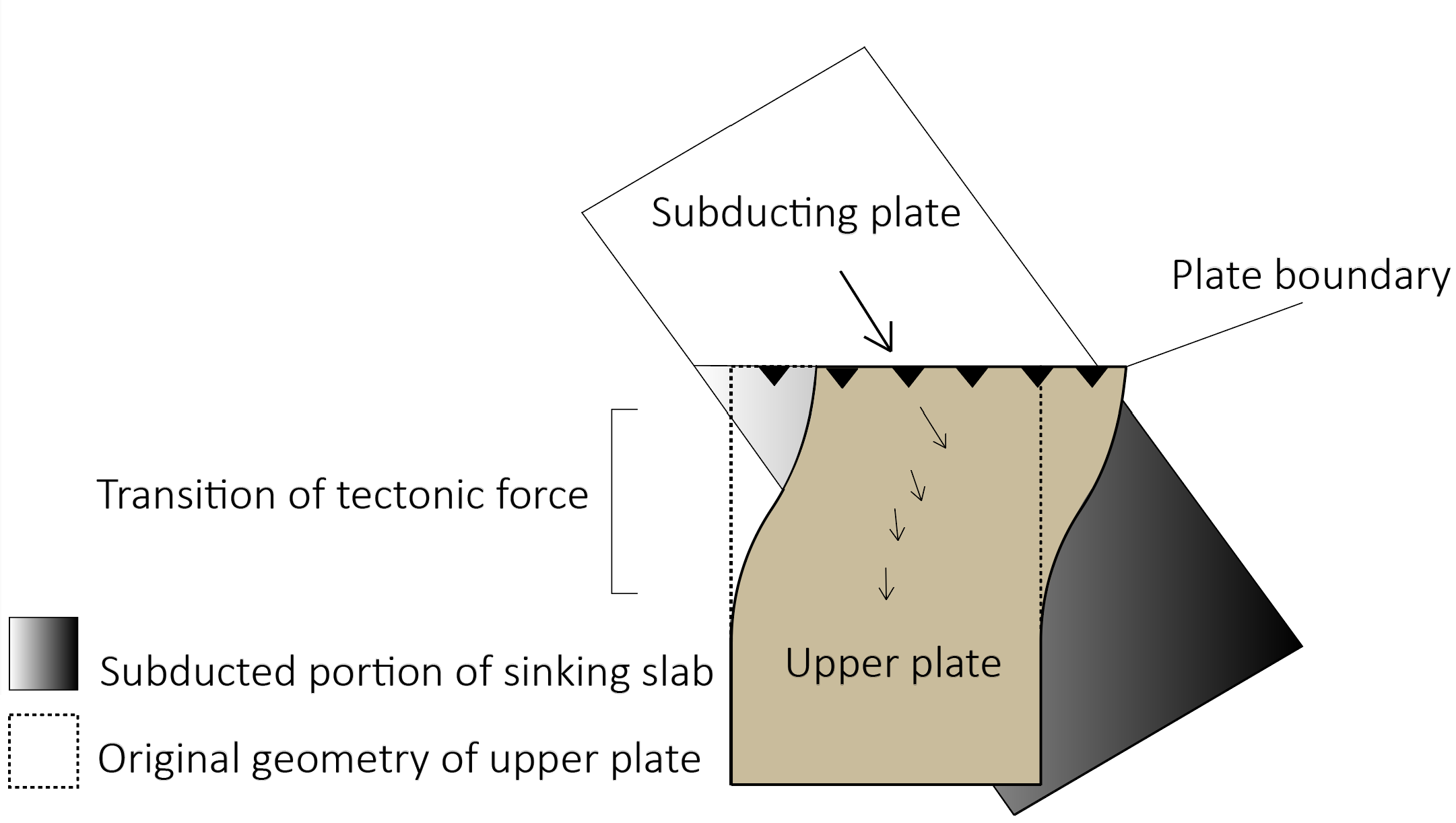
Top view of short term deformation model. The initial direction of tectonic force follows oblique subduction direction. Decline of trench parallel component causes gradual rotation of tectonic force. Therefore, only the forearc wedge, instead of the whole upper plate, is dragged. Adapted from Hoffmann-Rothe et al., 2006.

Short-term deformation is mainly elastic and acts at human time scale (i.e. perceptible during a human lifetime, unlike changes that take place on a geologic time scale). When the denser plate subducts beneath the upper plate, they are coupled at the interface (i.e. plate coupling). The process of plate coupling thus generates tectonic force that follows the subduction direction.

The orientation of tectonic force gradually rotates toward the trench normal direction. This attributes to the decline of trench parallel component when the force leaves the plate coupling zone. In this way, only the frontal part, rather than the whole upper plate, is dragged by the subducting slab.

=== Long-term deformation: Formation of forearc sliver and strike slip fault ===
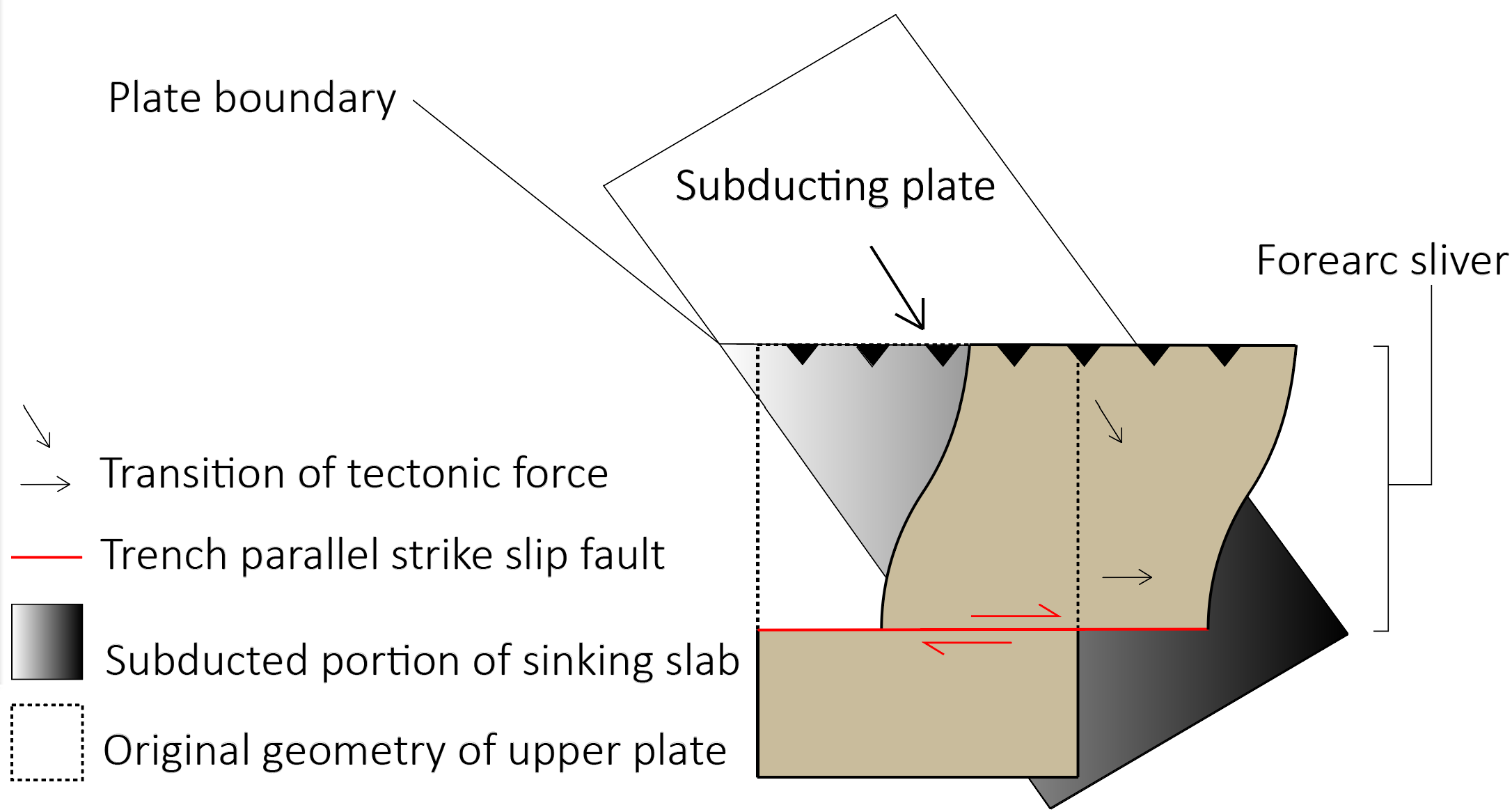
Top view of long term deformation model. The frontal part of upper plate permanently accommodates the trench parallel component of strain partitioning. As a result, tectonic force rotates gradually toward the trench parallel direction. The frontal part detaches from upper plate under enormous tectonic force, forming trench parallel strike slip fault system and forearc sliver. Adapted from Hoffmann-Rothe et al., 2006.

Long-term deformation occurs at geological time scale. Under continuous oblique subduction, the aforementioned frontal part of the upper plate permanently accommodates the trench parallel component. In this way, the orientation of tectonic force rotates gradually toward the trench parallel direction.

Strong and continuing tectonic force in trench parallel direction leads to the development of trench parallel strike slip fault system. The fault thus separate a portion of the forearc from the overriding plate, forming the forearc sliver.

== Tectonic events related to oblique subduction ==
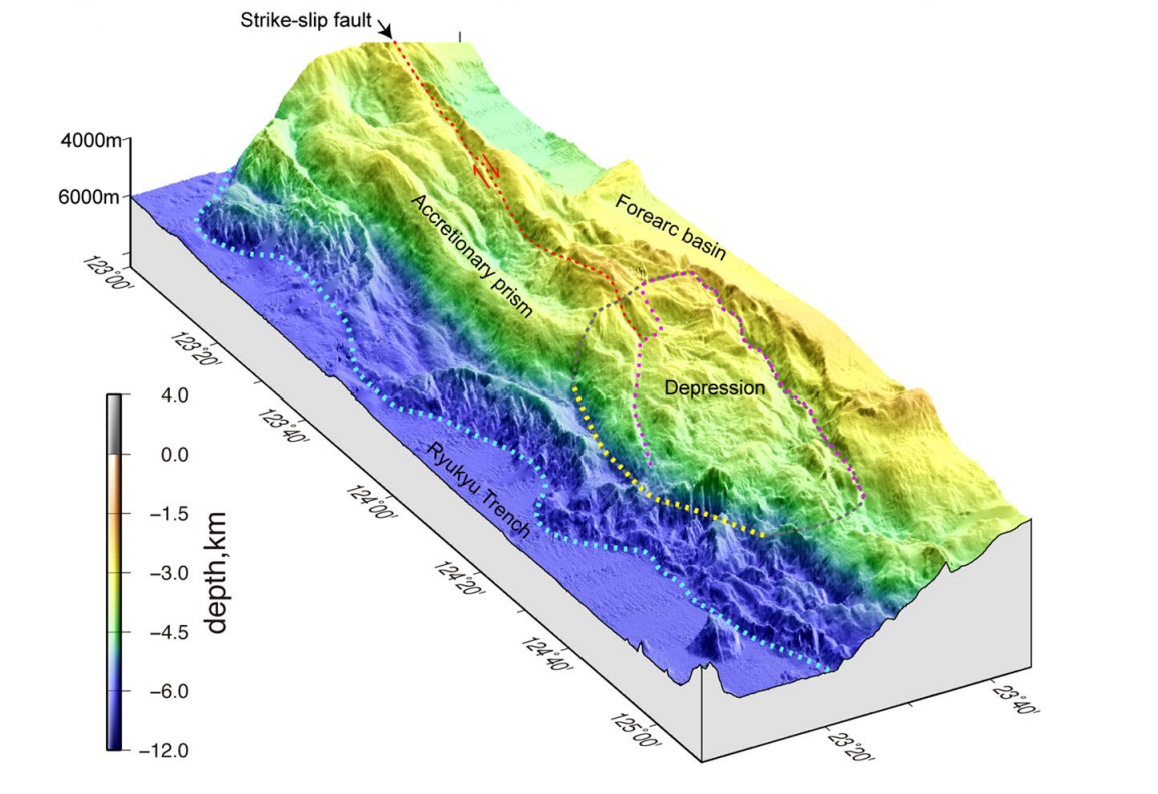
A bird's eye view of the accretionary wedge in Ryukyu oblique subduction zone. The inferred slide mass is outlined by the grey dotted line. Modified from Yukinobu et al., 2018.

=== The 1771 Great Yaeyama Tsunami ===
The tsunami occurred in the southwestern part of the Ryukyu arc. Yukinobu et al., (2018) suggested that oblique subduction was the primary reason leading to the occurrence of the tsunami.

Summary of Ryukyu oblique subductuon zone
Subduction velocity	50 to 63 mm per year
Subduction direction	N60°W to N50°W
Subduction obliquity angle	40° to 60°

==== Tectonic setting ====
In the plate boundary, an approximately 80 km long and 30 km wide depression is observed. It obscures trench parallel strike slip fault and the topographic ridge of the wedge.

==== Oblique subduction and tsunami ====
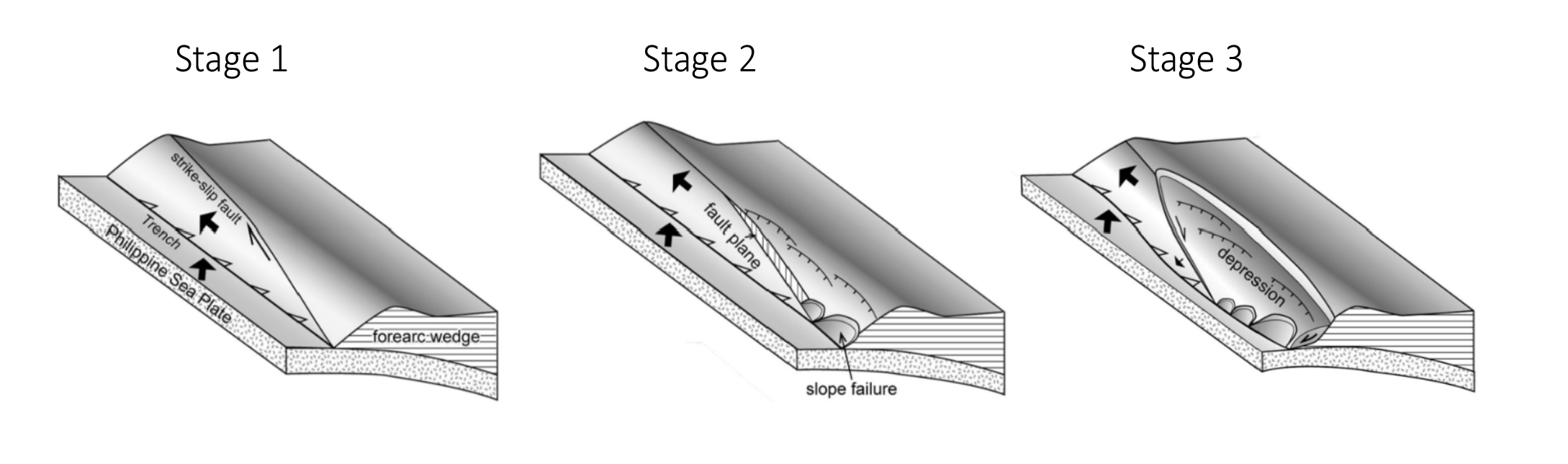
Simplified evolution diagram of the oblique subduction-induced tsunami. Stage 1: Formation of trench parallel strike slip fault owing to oblique subduction of the Philippine Sea Plate. The fault extended and reached the Ryukyu Trench. Stage 2: Movement of fault weakened the strength of the seaward slope. Resulting in several slope failures around the tip of the fault. Stage 3: Ongoing slope failures further weakened the slope. A large seaward block then collapsed and slid. During earthquake, the ground shaking caused the landward block to collapse seaward. Resulting in the great tsunami. Modified from Yukinobu et al., 2018.

=== Block rotation ===
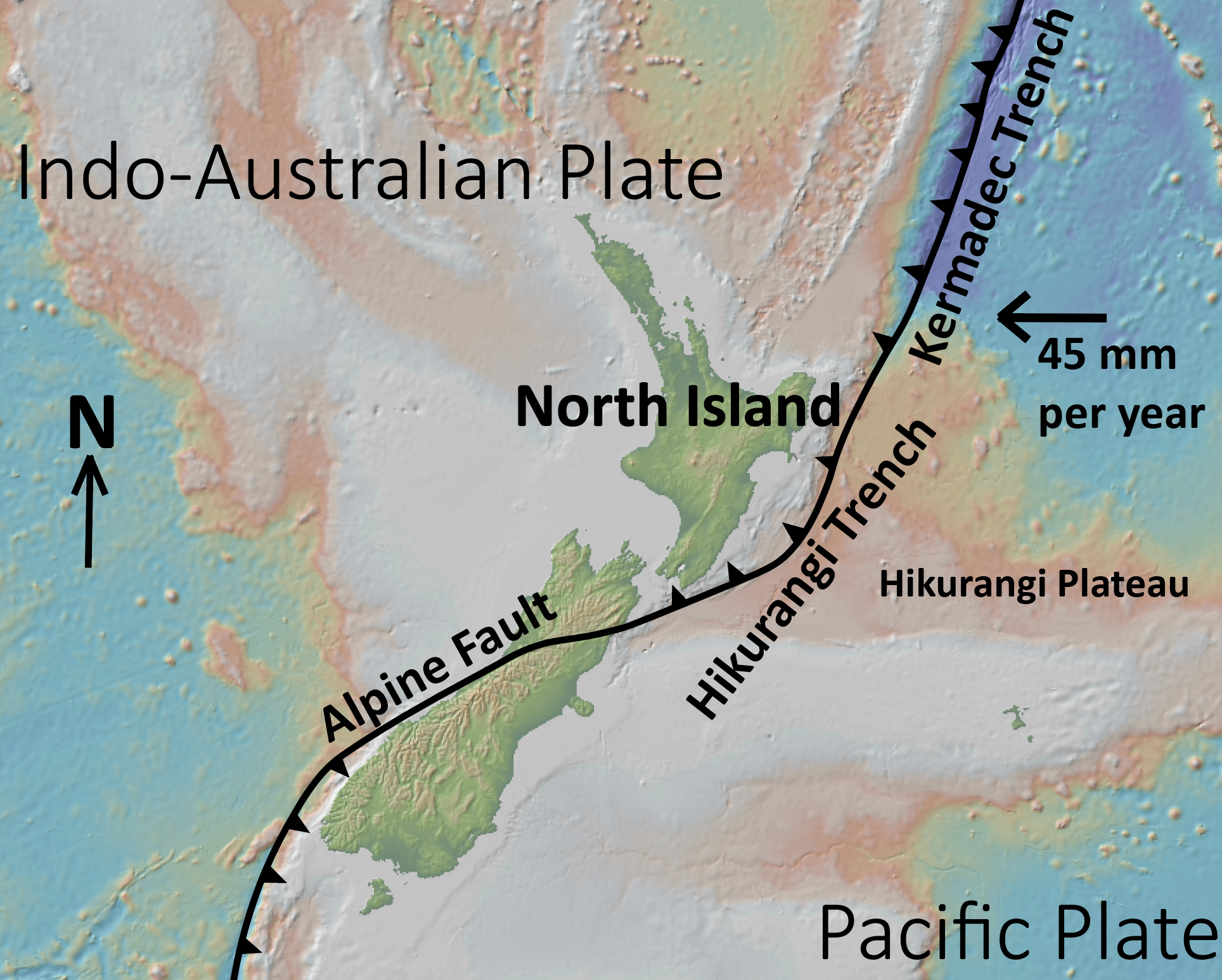
Tectonic setting of North Island oblique subduction zone. It was formed by the collision of the Pacific Plate and the Indo-Australian Plate. The convergence rate is about 45 mm per year. Figure made with GeoMapApp (www.geomapapp.org) (Ryan et al., 2009).

Oblique subduction has led to rotation of microblocks about nearby poles of rotation (See also: Euler poles) in some oblique subduction zones. In these regions, the trench parallel strike slip fault systems are less prominent. This is because a portion of the trench parallel component is accommodated by the microblock rotation.

Examples of oblique subduction-induced block rotation are identified in North Island, Cascadia and New Guinea.

==== Example: North Island oblique subduction zone ====
===== Tectonic setting =====
The North Island oblique subduction zone in New Zealand was established by the obliquely subducting Pacific Plate beneath the Indo-Australian Plate. A trench parallel strike slip fault system, North Island Dextral Fault Belt, was formed. Based on geological and geodetic data, five tectonic blocks are identified in the region. These blocks are separated by block-bounding faults.

===== Microblock rotation =====
Based on GPS measurement, a clockwise rotation of microblocks at a rate of 0.5° to 3.8° per million year relative to the Indo-Australian Plate is observed. This caused tectonic extension in Taupō Volcanic Zone and tectonic shortening in northwestern South Island, for example the Buller region.

In addition, the block rotation accommodates 25% to 65% of the trench parallel component from oblique subduction. Therefore, high rate trench parallel strike slip faults are absent in the North Island.

===== Rotation mechanism =====
In the oblique subduction zone, the sinking slab is characterized by the Hikurangi plateau in the south. The thickness of this oceanic plateau ranges from 15 km to 10 km along the oceanic trench. The along strike thickness variation leads to differential subduction rate. In the southern trench, thick oceanic plateau induces high collisional resistance forces that cripples the subduction process. However, the thin oceanic crust in the north is subducted. This activated the tectonic block rotations about a nearby axis.

=== Closure of Northeastern Paleo-Tethys Ocean ===
==== Geological setting ====
The Qinling-Dabieshan orogen in central China consists of three separate plates, including the north China plate, the Qinling-Dabieshan microplate, and the south China plate. Geological and geochemical analysis suggest that there was an ocean basin between the plates and it was part of the Paleo-Tethys Ocean

==== Evidence of oblique subduction ====
Tectonic features of oblique subduction, for example a right lateral strike-slip thrust belt are identified in the tectonic zone. These evidence suggest that the south China plate was obliquely subducted to the northwest beneath the north China plate in the Early Mesozoic and led to the closure of the northeastern Paleo-Tethys Ocean.

== Example of oblique subduction ==
=== Peru-Chile trench ===
The Peru–Chile Trench is part of the Andean oblique subduction zone that was formed as a result of oblique subduction between the sinking Nazca Plate and the South American Plate. The current subduction direction is at east-north-east (see the summary below). However, geological record shows southeast subduction direction in Late Cretaceous period.

Summary of Andean oblique subduction zone
Subduction velocity	66 mm per year
Subduction direction	N78°E
Subduction obliquity angle	Range from 22° to 32°

=== Margin parallel strike slip faults ===
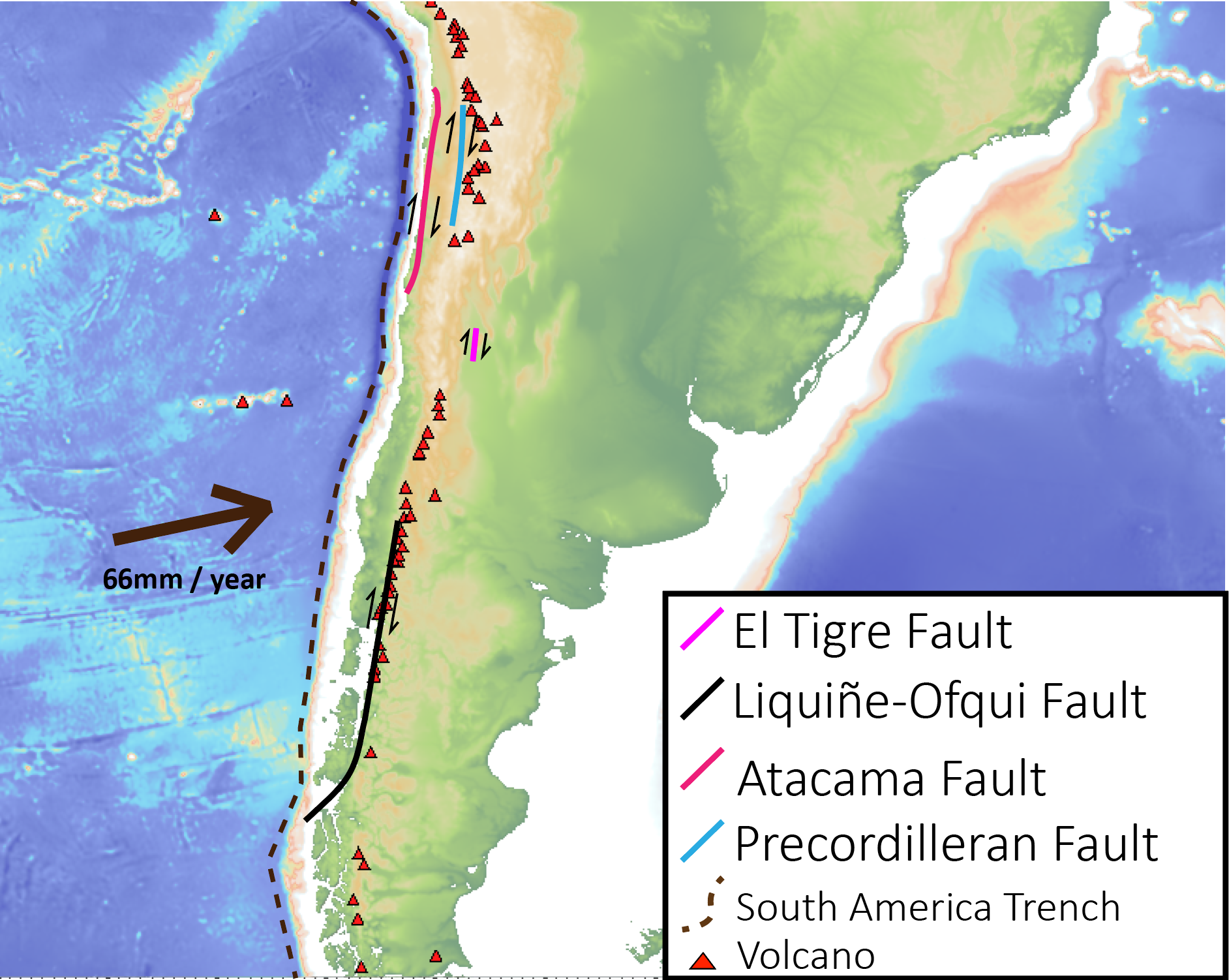
Locations of four major trench parallel strike slip fault in South America. Adapted from Hoffmann-Rothe et al., 2006. Figure made with GeoMapApp (www.geomapapp.org) (Ryan et al., 2009).

Four major trench parallel strike slip faults are identified in the oblique subduction zone. Liquiñe-Ofqui Fault is a 1,200 km long fault that located in the southern Andes. Left lateral strike slip motion was active during Mesozoic period. In Pliocene period, strike slip motion of the fault system changed to right lateral motion to accommodate the trench parallel slip component from oblique subduction.

The El Tigre Fault is observed in the central part of the subduction zone. It is a relatively short strike slip fault (ca. 120 km) that located further landward. The slip rate of the fault system is approximately 1 mm per year.

The Atacama Fault and the Precordilleran Fault are located in northern Chile. The Atacama Fault extends more than 1,000 km. It was formed during the Mid to Late Jurassic period as a left-lateral fault due to oblique subduction of the Phoenix Plate. The fault system has been inactive since the Miocene Period. The right lateral slip rate is estimated to be less than 1 mm per year since the Pliocene.

The Precordilleran Fault, also known as the Domeyko fault, is composed of several anastomosing faults (i.e. branching and irregular faults) including Sierra Moreno Fault, West Fault and Limon Verde. Precordilleran Fault was formed in the Late Eocene. In Neogene period, the fault system changed from left lateral to right lateral motion along with the uplift of the Precordillera.

=== Forearc sliver ===
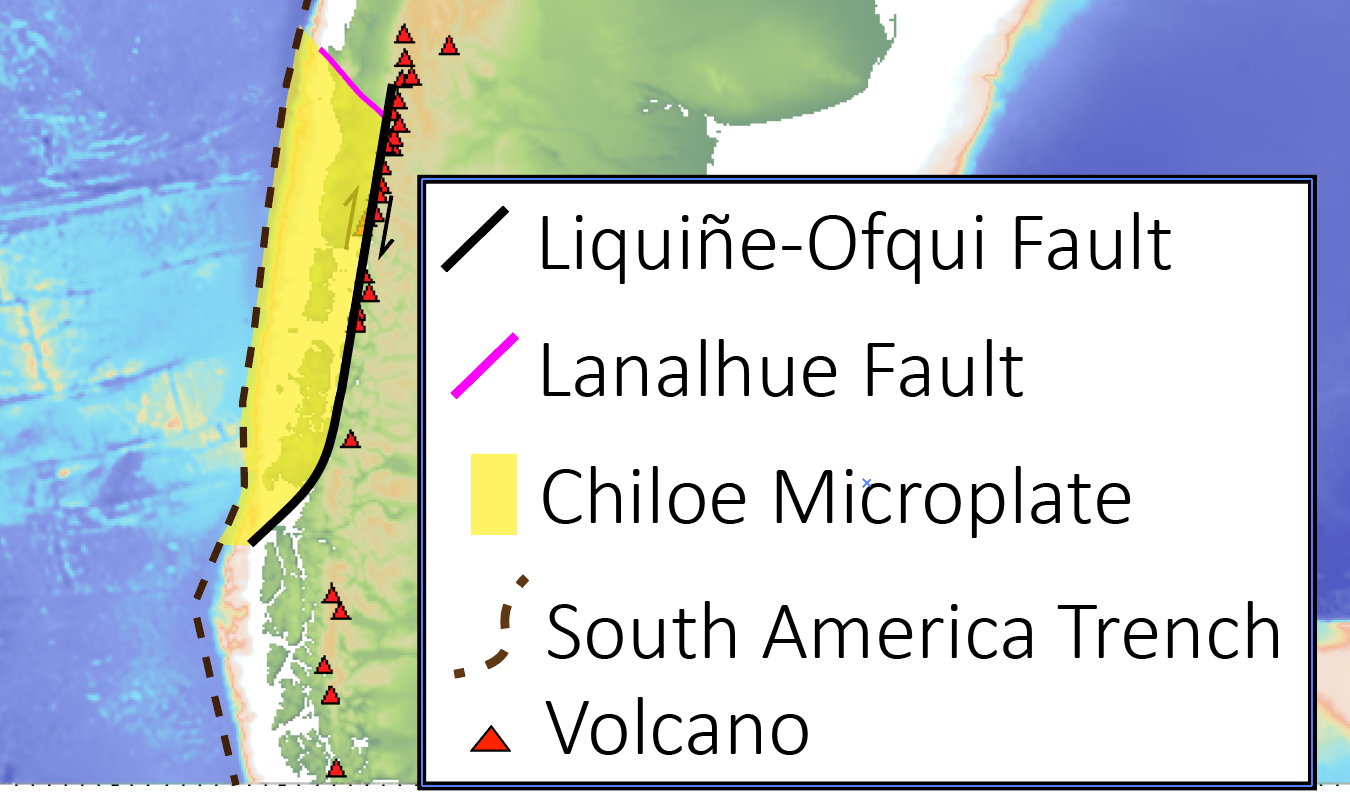
Location of Chiloe Microplate. The Chiloe Microplate is bounded by the northwest striking Lanalhue Fault in Arauco Peninsula in the north and Chile Triple Junction in the south. Figure made with GeoMapApp (www.geomapapp.org) (Ryan et al., 2009).

Two major forearc slivers are observed along the Peru-Chile Trench. The Peruvian Sliver, also known as Inca Sliver, has a width of 300 to 400 km and a total length of over 1,500 km. It extends from the Gulf of Guayaquil in the north to the Altiplano in the south. The continental boundary is located between the Western Cordillera and the Eastern Cordillera.

Chiloe Microplate, also known as Chiloe Block, is a forearc sliver that detached along the Liquine Ofqui Fault. It is bounded by Arauco Peninsula and Chile Triple Junction. The sliver moves northward with a motion rate ranges from 32 mm per year in the south to 13 mm per year in the north. This northward motion not only caused by the oblique subduction of the Nazca Plate, but also the oblique collision and spreading of the Chile Rise at the southern edge of the sliver.

== See also ==
- Forearc
- Oblique-slip fault
- Oceanic trench
- Plate tectonics
- Strain partitioning
- Strike slip fault
- Subduction
- Thrust
