= Tigre =

Tigre ("Tiger" in various languages), Tigres or El Tigre may refer to:

== Arts and entertainment ==
- Le Tigre, an American rock band
  - Le Tigre (album)
- El Tigre: The Adventures of Manny Rivera, a Nickelodeon animated TV series
  - El Tigre: The Adventures of Manny Rivera (video game)
- Il Tigre, internationally released as The Tiger and the Pussycat, a 1967 Italian comedy film

== Military ==
- Tigre, the French and Spanish name for the Eurocopter Tiger attack helicopter
- Spanish ship Tigre (1747), of the Spanish navy
- French ship Tigre, a number of French navy ships
- HMS Tigre, a number of Royal Navy ships

== People ==
- Tigre people, an ethnic group inhabiting Eritrea and Sudan
  - Tigre language
- Tigrayan-Tigrinya people, closely linked but different groups of Ethiopia and Eritrea
  - Tigrinya language
  - Tigre Province, a region of the Ethiopian Empire
- Le Tigre, a nickname of French statesman Georges Clemenceau (1841–1929)
- El Tigre, a nickname of Mexican businessman Emilio Azcárraga Milmo (1930–1997)
- El Tigre, a nickname of Colombian politician Abelardo de la Espriella (born 1978)
- El Tigre Jr., ringname of Canadian professional wrestler Tyson Moody (born 1978)
- El Tigre, a nickname of Colombian footballer Radamel Falcao (born 1986)

== Places ==
- Tigre Province, Ethiopia
- Tigre, Buenos Aires, Argentina
  - Tigre Partido
- El Tigre Fault, a seismically active fault in Argentina
- Tiger Island, or Tigre Island, Honduras
- Tigre River, Peru
- Tigre District, Loreto, Peru
- Tigre River (Venezuela)
- El Tigre, Anzoátegui, Venezuela
  - El Tigre Airport
- Tigris River, in other languages

== Sports ==
- Club Atlético Tigre, an Argentine sports club
- Tigre Rugby Club, an Argentine rugby union club
- Tigre, a nickname of Bolivian football club The Strongest
- Tigres F.C., a professional Colombian football team
- Tigres UANL, a Mexican football club
- Tigres de Aragua, a Venezuelan baseball team
- Tigres de Cartagena, a Colombian baseball team
- Tigres de Quintana Roo, a Mexican baseball team
- Tigres de Chinandega, a Nicaraguan baseball team
- Tigres del Licey, a Dominican Republic baseball team

== Other uses ==
- Tigre (rifle), a Spanish copy of the Winchester Model 1892
- Le Tigre (clothing brand), an American clothing brand
- Tigre Club, now the Tigre Municipal Museum of Fine Art, Buenos Aires, Argentina
- Tigre Hotel, a former hotel, Buenos Aires, Argentina
- El Tigre, a 1993 meteorite fall in Mexico

== See also ==
- Tiger (disambiguation)
- Tigray (disambiguation)
