= Tigrinya =

Tigrinya may refer to:

- Tigrinya language, an Afroasiatic language spoken in Eritrea and Ethiopia
- Tigrinya people, an ethnic group of Eritrea

== See also ==
- Tigray (disambiguation)
- Tigrayan-Tigrinya people (disambiguation)
