= Schaum (manufacturer) =

Defunct American motor vehicle manufacturer

The Schaum was an American veteran era automobile, designed by William A. Schaum and manufactured from 1900 until 1903 in Baltimore, Maryland.

== History ==
Schaum Automobile and Motor Manufacturing Company
- Founded: 1900; 126 years ago
- Founder: William A. Shaum
- Defunct: 1903; 123 years ago
- Fate: ceased trading - closed
- Headquarters: Baltimore, Maryland, United States
- Products: Automobiles
- Production output: 26 (1900-1903)

Schaum Automobile and Motor Manufacturing Company of Baltimore, Maryland, manufactured spark plugs among other automotive components, and a gasoline runabout that could seat two, four or six passengers. The Schaum had a single-cylinder 4 to 7hp engine driven with a side chain drive, and had a top speed of 20mph and was given no brakes. Schaum insisted his car would stop on any hill at any speed, but he did not explain how.

16 cars were built to sell under his Schaum name and ten vehicles were built for the Autocarette Company of Washington, D.C. These were built as 20 passenger cars, and proved to be a problem for Autocarette and Schaum arguing as to whether the balance due on the $40,000 purchase price had to be paid.

William A. Schaum changed his name to William A. De Shaum and would have a checkered career being involved with the De Shaum and Suburban automobiles and the Tiger cyclecar in 1914.
