= Tyger =

Tyger may refer to:

== Arts and entertainment ==
- "The Tyger", a 1794 poem by the English poet William Blake
- Tyger (album), by Tangerine Dream, 1987
- "Tyger", a song by The Cult from the 2000 album Spirit\Light\Speed
- Ras Tyger, protagonist of Lord Tyger, a 1970 American novel by Philip José Farmer
- Tyger Tiger, or Jessan Hoan, a fictional character in Marvel Comics
- TYGER Security, a fictional security firm in the video game Batman: Arkham City

== People ==
- Tyger Campbell (born 2000), American basketball player
- Tyger Drew-Honey (born 1996), English actor, musician, and TV presenter
- Amanda Lucas (fighter) (born 1981), known earlier as an actress as Tyger

== Other uses ==
- Tyger (ship), a 17th century Dutch ship
- HMS Tyger, a Royal Navy frigate launched in 1647
- Tyger River, South Carolina, U.S.
- Tyger Society, group at Dartmouth College
- Tyger (heraldry), a heraldic tiger

== See also ==
- Tiger (disambiguation)
- Tiger Tiger (disambiguation)
- Tygers of Pan Tang, a heavy metal band
- Tygerberg, a district in the northern suburbs of Cape Town in South Africa
