= De Schaum =

Defunct American motor vehicle manufacturer

De Shaum Motor Syndicate Company
- Founded: 1908; 118 years ago
- Founder: William A. De Shaum
- Defunct: 1909; 117 years ago
- Fate: closed
- Headquarters: Buffalo, New York, United States
- Products: High wheeler
- Production output: 36 (1908-1909)
- Brands: De Shaum, Seven Little Buffaloes

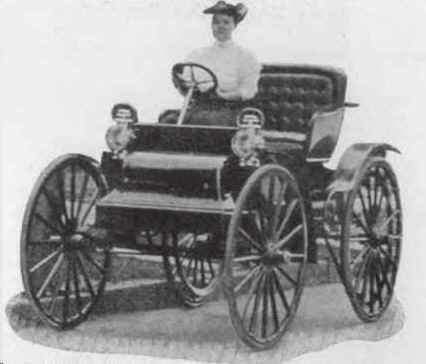
1908 Seven Little Buffaloes

The De Schaum was an American automobile manufactured in Buffalo, New York from 1908 to 1909. The company offered a 7 hp High wheeler called the De Shaum and Seven Little Buffaloes.

== History ==
William A. De Shaum was William A Shaum with a new name. After building the Shaum automobile in Baltimore, he arrived in Buffalo in 1906 and built a high wheeler for C. Rossler Manufacturing Company.

In 1908 he formed the De Shaum Motor Syndicate Company and began building a high-wheeler under his own name. High-wheeler sales were on the decline and for 1909 he renamed the De Shaum as the Seven Little Buffaloes.

De Shaum was out of business before the end of the year and began a new venture in Hornell, New York in 1910. No cars were ever produced in Hornell and he left for Michigan where he formed a new De Shaum Motor Car Company and the Suburban Motor Car Company.
