= Hilbet =

Traditional food in Eritrea

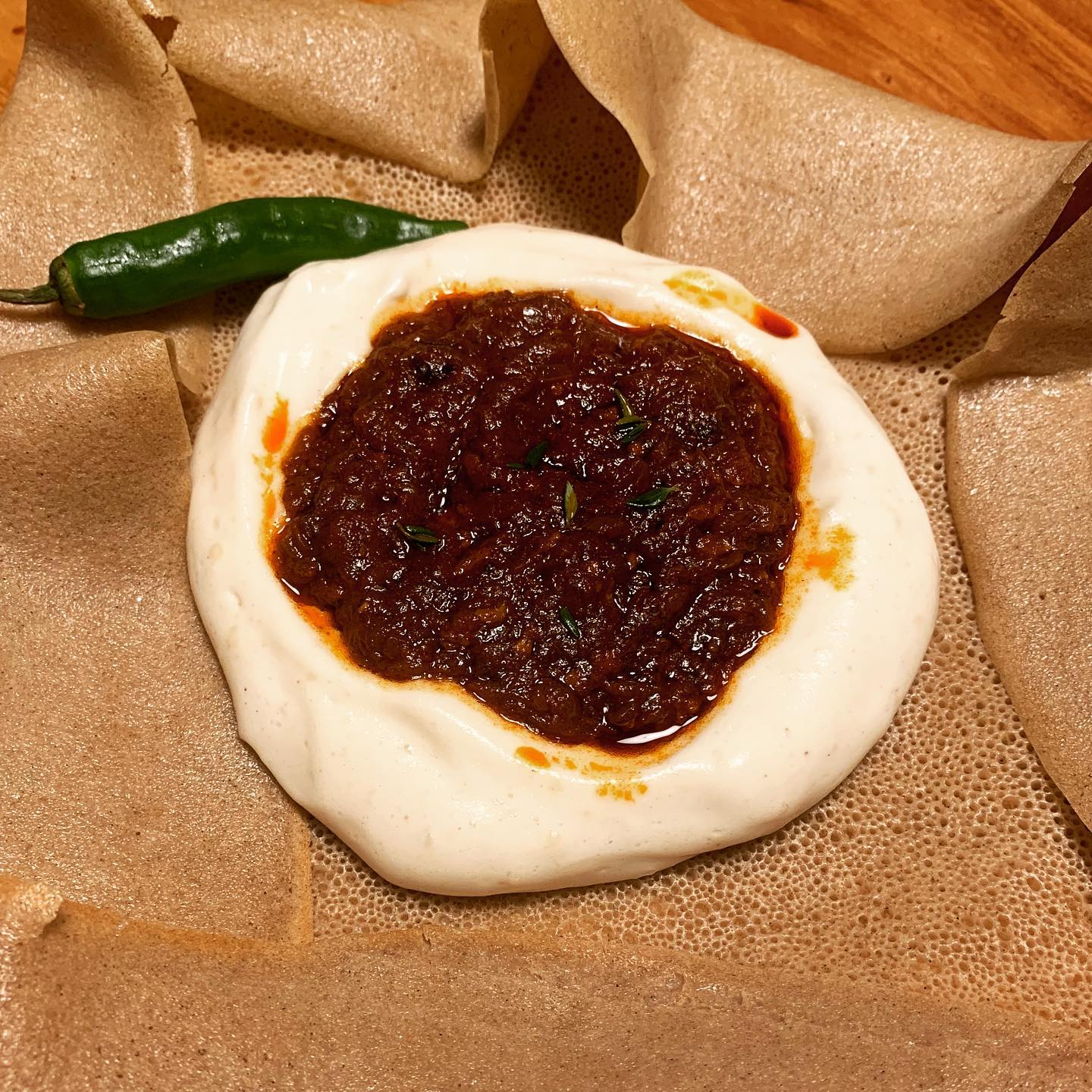
Hilbet food

Hilbet (Tigrinya፡ ሕልበት) is a traditional food originating from the Tigray-Tigrinya people found in southern Eritrea and northern Ethiopia. It is a vegan food that is made from fava beans, fenugreek, lentil, and other spices that are ground into a powder. The Hilbet powder is then cooked and whipped to make a cream-like texture. At the center of the Hilbet it will have chili pepper-based sauce and is eaten using Injera.

Its consumption is very widespread in the historic regions like Akkele Guzay and Agame.
