= Tigra (disambiguation) =

Tigra is a fictional character in Marvel Comics.

Tigra may also refer to:

- Tigra (DC Comics), a fictional character in DC Comics
- Tigra (gaon), a village in Gurgaon, Haryana, India
- Tigra Dam, on the Sank River, near Gwalior, Madhya Pradesh, India
- Tigra (cycling team), a Swiss cycling team 1950–1969
- Opel Tigra (also Vauxhall Tigra, Holden Tigra, and Chevrolet Tigra), a motor car
- Lady Tigra, of the hip-hop duo L'Trimm

== See also ==
- La Tigra (disambiguation)
- Tigre (disambiguation)
- Tiger (disambiguation)
- Tigar (disambiguation)
- Tigrayans, an ethnic group in Eritrea and Ethiopia
- Tygra, a character from ThunderCats
