= Tiga =

Tiga or TIGA may refer to:

== People ==
- Tiga (musician) (born 1974), Canadian musician
- Tiga, pseudonym of Haitian artist Jean-Claude Garoute
- Tiga Angelina, Indian politician
- Tiga Bayles (1953–2016), Australian radio presenter
- Adriana Aparecida Costa (born 1983), Brazilian football and futsal player

== Places ==
- Tiga Dam, a dam in Nigeria
- Tiga Island, a small Melanesian island in the Loyalty Islands of New Caledonia
  - Tiga Airport
- Tiga Island, Malaysia

== Other uses ==
- Texas Instruments Graphics Architecture (TIGA)
- The Independent Games Developers Association (TIGA)
- Tiga Race Cars, a racing car manufacturer
- Ultraman Tiga, a Japanese tokusatsu TV show

== See also ==
- Tiger (disambiguation)
- Taiga, a biome characterized by coniferous forests
- Tigas, a group of independent pharmacies in Malaysia
