= Schaum =

Schaum may refer to:

- Hermann Rudolph Schaum (1819–65), German entomologist
- John W. Schaum (1905–88), American pianist, composer and tutor
- Karl Schaum (1870–1947), German chemist.
- Schaum (manufacturer), defunct automobile manufacturer
- Schaum's Outlines, teaching text supplement
