= Tigar =

Tigar may refer to:

== People ==
- Edward Wharton-Tigar (c. 1913–1995), British mining executive, World War II spy and saboteur
- Kenneth Tigar (born 1942), American actor
- Jon S. Tigar (born 1962), United States District Judge, son of Michael Tigar
- Michael Tigar (born 1941), American criminal defense attorney

== Other uses ==
- Tigar Tyres, a Serbian tire manufacturing company
- Operation Tigar, a 1992 military operation
- Tigar, a character in The Tiger (1978 film); also the original name of the film
- TIGAR, the TP53-inducible glycolysis and apoptosis regulator protein

== See also ==
- Tiger (disambiguation)
- Tigra (disambiguation)
