= HMS Tigress =

Four ships of the Royal Navy have borne the name HMS Tigress, after the female tiger:

- HMS Tigress (1797) was a 12-gun Courser-class gun-brig launched in 1797 and sold in 1802.
- HMS Tigress (1804) was a 12-gun Archer-class gun-brig launched in 1804 that the Danes captured in 1808.
- HMS Tigress (1808) was a 12-gun gun-brig, previously the French ship Pierre Czar. She was captured in 1808, and was renamed HMS Algerine in 1814. She was sold in 1818.
- HMS Tigress (1911) was an Acheron-class destroyer launched in 1911. She was sold in 1921 and was broken up the following year.

== See also ==
- HMS Tiger
- HMS Tigris
