= Tigers (sports teams) =

Tigers may refer to one of several sports teams:

== Australia ==
- Richmond Football Club, a Victorian based Australian rules football team
- Wests Tigers (2000–), a south western Sydney-based rugby league team formed by a merger between Western Suburbs Magpies & the Balmain Tigers
- Claremont Tigers, a Perth-based Australian rules football team
- Eastern Suburbs Tigers, a Brisbane rugby league team
- Glenelg Tigers, a South Australian based Australian rules football team
- Hobart Tigers, a Tasmanian Australian rules football team
- Nightcliff Football Club, a Darwin based Australian rules football team in the Northern Territory Football League
- Queanbeyan Football Club, an Australian rules football club that compete in the AFL Canberra competition
- Melbourne Tigers, a Melbourne basketball team
- Balmain Tigers (1909–2000), a Sydney-based former rugby league team which merged with Western Suburbs Magpies to become the Wests Tigers in 2000
- Mayne Australian Football Club, an Australian rules football team

== Bangladesh ==
- Bangladesh national cricket team
- Chittagong Tigers, a franchise cricket team in the Bangladesh Premier League

== Canada ==
- Medicine Hat Tigers, a junior ice hockey team in the Western Hockey League
- Hamilton Tigers (football) (1873–1950), a Canadian football team now called the Hamilton Tiger-Cats
- Hamilton Tigers (NHL) (1920–1925), a former National Hockey League professional ice hockey team
- Calgary Tigers (1920–27, 1932–36), a Western Canada Hockey League team
- Dalhousie Tigers, the varsity sports teams of Dalhousie University
- Campbellton Tigers a junior A hockey team in the Maritime Junior A Hockey League
- Victoriaville Tigres, a junior ice hockey team in the Quebec Major Junior Hockey League

== England ==
- Hull City A.F.C., an association football club
- Castleford Tigers, a rugby league club
- Leicester Tigers, a rugby union club
- Brighton Tigers (1935–1965), an ice hockey team
- Telford Tigers, an Ice Hockey Team

== Finland ==
- Kokkola Tigers, a volleyball team
- Tampere Tigers, a baseball team
- Tikkurila Tigers, a floorball team

== Germany ==
- Tigers Tübingen, a basketball team

== Indonesia ==
- Persija Jakarta, an association football club based in Jakarta
- Persib Bandung, an association football club based in Bandung
- Persik Kediri, an association football club based in Kediri

== Japan ==
- Hanshin Tigers, a Koshien-based baseball team owned by Hanshin Electric Railway Co

== Malaysia ==
- Johor Darul Ta'zim F.C., an association football club

== Mexico ==
- Tigres UANL, an association football club based in Monterrey, Nuevo León
- Tigres de Quintana Roo, a baseball team located in Cancun, Quintana Roo, Mexico

== Nigeria ==
- D'Tigers, nickname for Nigeria's national basketball team

== Northern Ireland ==
- Dungannon Tigers F.C., an association football club based in Dungannon, Northern Ireland

== Norway ==
- Frisk Tigers, an ice hockey club

== Philippines ==
- Davao Occidental Tigers, a professional basketball team based in Malita, Davao Occidental
- Mandaluyong El Tigre, a professional basketball team based in Mandaluyong
- UST Growling Tigers, varsity teams of the University of Santo Tomas

== Poland ==
- Kraków Tigers, an American football team

== Slovenia ==
- Domžale Tigers, an American football team

== South Africa ==
- Cape Town Tigers, a basketball club based in Cape Town
- Ikey Tigers, a rugby union team from the University of Cape Town

== South Korea ==
- Kia Tigers, a Korea Baseball Organization team based in Gwangju City
- Ulsan Hyundai FC, a K League 1 team based in Ulsan City

== Switzerland ==
- SCL Tigers, an ice hockey organization based in Switzerland

== United States ==
- Auburn Tigers, team name of the Auburn University Athletics
- Cincinnati Bengals, a National Football League team
- Clemson Tigers, team name of the Clemson University Athletics
- Colorado College Tigers, team name of Colorado College, Colorado Springs, Colorado
- Detroit Tigers, a Major League Baseball team
- DePauw Tigers, team name of DePauw University Athletics
- East Central Tigers, team name of East Central University (Oklahoma) Athletics
- Fort Hays State Tigers, team name of Fort Hays State University Athletics
- Grambling State Tigers, team name of Grambling State University Athletics
- Hampden-Sydney Tigers, team name of Hampden-Sydney College Athletics
- Idaho State Bengals, team name of Idaho State University Athletics
- Jackson State Tigers, team name of Jackson State University Athletics
- Las Vegas Junior College Tigers, team name of Las Vegas Junior College Athletics
- Lincoln Blue Tigers, team name of Lincoln University in Missouri Athletics
- LSU Tigers, team name of the Louisiana State University Athletics
- Memphis Tigers, team name of University of Memphis athletics
- Missouri Tigers, team name of the University of Missouri Athletics
- Occidental Tigers, team name of Occidental College Athletics
- Ouachita Baptist Tigers, team name of Ouachita Baptist University Athletics
- Pacific Tigers, team name of the University of the Pacific Athletics
- Princeton Tigers, team name and mascot of the Princeton University Athletics Department
- RCC Tigers, team name and mascot of Riverside City College, Riverside, California
- RIT Tigers, team name and mascot of Rochester Institute of Technology, Rochester, New York
- Savannah State Tigers, team name of Savannah State University athletics
- Sewanee Tigers, team name of the University of the South athletics
- Tennessee State Tigers, team name of Tennessee State University athletics
- Texas Southern Tigers, team name of Texas Southern University athletics
- Towson Tigers, team name of Towson University Athletics
- Trinity Tigers, team name of Trinity University athletic program
- West Alabama Tigers, team name of the University of West Alabama athletic program

== See also ==
- The Tigers (disambiguation)
- Tiger (disambiguation)
