= Tiger Force (disambiguation) =

Tiger Force was a U.S. Army unit that fought in the Vietnam War.

Tiger Force may also refer to:

- Tiger Force (air), or the Very Long Range Bomber Force, an air force unit of the British Commonwealth
- Tiger Forces, a special forces unit of the Syrian Arab Army
- All Tripura Tiger Force, an isolationist group in India
- Bhutan Tiger Force, the armed wing of the Bhutan Communist Party (Marxist–Leninist–Maoist)
- Khalistan Tiger Force, Indian Sikh militant group
- Tiger Faction New Forces, a South Sudanese rebel group

== See also ==
- Tigers Militia, militia active during the Lebanese War
- Tamil Tigers or Liberation Tigers of Tamil Eelam (1976–2009), faction of the Sri Lankan Civil War
- Tiger (disambiguation)#Military
