= Tiger (surname) =

Tiger is a surname. Notable people with the name include:

- Dana Tiger (born 1961), Muscogee/Seminole/Cherokee artist
- Dick Tiger (1929–1971), Nigerian boxer
- Jerome Tiger (1941–1967), Seminole/Muscogee artist
- Johnny Tiger Jr. (1940–2015), Seminole/Muscogee artist
- Lionel Tiger (born 1937), anthropologist
- Peggy Tiger (1943–2017), Cherokee author
- Yuriko Tiger or Eleonora Aureliana Guglielmi (born 1993), Italian cosplay celebrity

== See also ==
- Tiger (nickname)
- Big Tiger, Principal Chief of the council of a dissident group of Cherokee (1824–1828)
- Buffalo Tiger (1920–2015), leader of the Miccosukee Tribe in Florida
