= Sumatra Trench =

Subduction trench in the Sumatra-Andaman subduction zone in the eastern Indian Ocean

The Sumatra Trench is a part of the Sunda Trench or Java Trench. The Sunda subduction zone (called also: the Sumatra-Andaman subduction zone) is located in the east part of Indian Ocean, and is about 300 km (190 mi) from the southwest coast of Sumatra and Java islands. It extends over 5,000 km (3,100 mi) long, starting from Myanmar in the northwest and ending at Sumba Island in the southeast.

== Geological settings ==
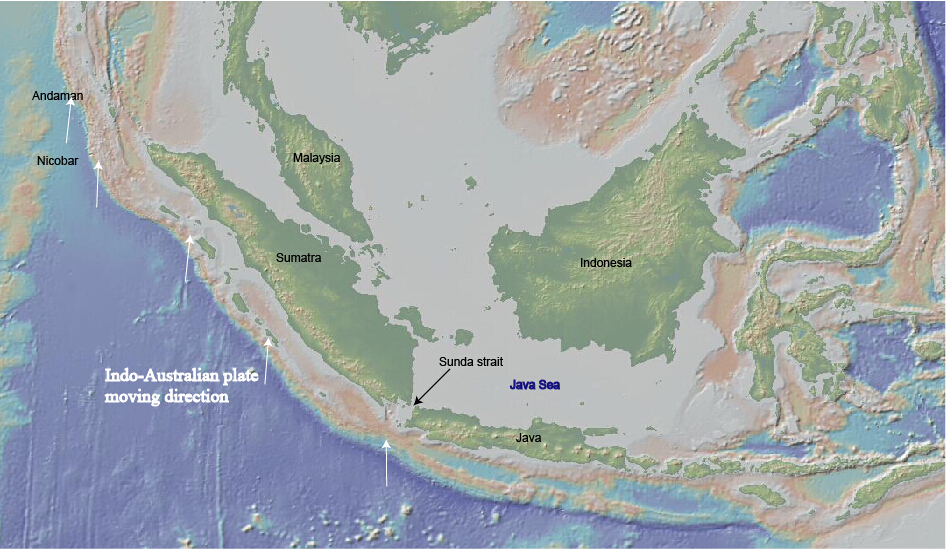

The Java trench was generated by the oblique subduction of the Indo-Australian plate into the Sunda plate at a rate of 61mm/y (in the south) and 51mm/y (in the north). The oceanic crust being subducted via this accretionary margin has variable ages (40 to 100 Ma) and structure along the trench. There is also research showing that arc parallel dextral strike-slip fault systems (i.e. the Great Sumatra fault) developed on the landward side of the Sunda forearc to absorb part of the dextral motions associated with the oblique plate convergence. After the disastrous 2004 Sumatran tsunami, more and more researchers begin to study this area. The trench slope is now being considered as a result of folds and faults in the area which were originated from the local seafloor deformation.

Seismic profiles at Sumatra Trench shows that, the down-going Indo-Australian Plate has its slip vectors rotate to a NE direction. This indicates that the plate motion is dominated by the dextral shear inside the Indo-Australian plate in the order of 3.6–4.9 cm/yr. Transpressive deformation of the subducting plate edge is the primary to absorb the shear force. At the southeast section of this area, the Sumatra fault zone bends towards south and merges into the extensional south striking fault system of the Sumatra trait. The Sumatra Trench near the northwestern and western parts of Sumatra are defined as a high hazard region where 6.0 and 7.0 Mw magnitude earthquakes can generate quite often, i.e. every 6–12 and 10–30 years, respectively.

The Sumatra Fault Zone (SFZ) is the most worth noting area on the Eurasian plate near the Sumatra Trench. Within the Sumatra Fault Zone lies the majority of the right-lateral stress from the relative motion between the Indo-Australian and Eurasian plates. The Sumatra Fault Zone meets the south trending extensional faulting system in Sunda Strait in Semangka. The fault zone can generate submarine pull-apart grabens.

== Structure ==
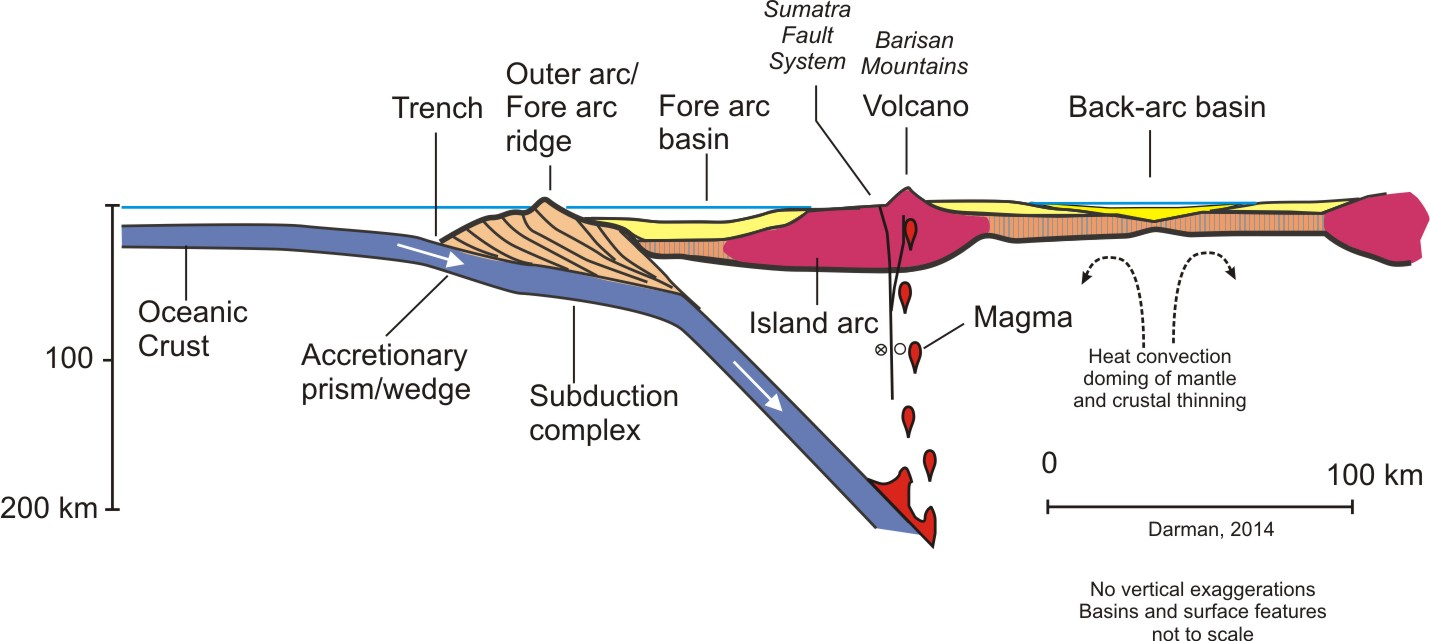
Schematic cross-section of the subduction complex

In the convergent margins where accretion plays an important role, prism width varies from 40 km to 350 km. The width at Sumatra trench is controlled by sediment input and accretion rate and history. One distinguishing feature of the Sumatra subduction zone is that it has a relatively wide 120–140 km accretionary prism and a deep forearc basin (so does the rest of the whole Java subduction zone). However it does vary along the trench. The prism is broad and has a relatively shallow surface slope in the northern part, becomes steep and narrow at the central part, then becomes steep and narrow in the southern area.

=== Accretionary prism ===
The inner part of the prism forms a NW-SE arc ridge offshore Sumatra with Enggano Islands being its highest point. This arc ridge has the widths of 30–60 km and is made up of 5 to 6 southward thrusting imbricated flakes. The flakes can be easily noticed due to their distinctive characteristics such as morphology, synclines, turn-overs and size. A distinctive strip-thrust fold locates on the western boundary of the accretionary wedge occurs on south of Enggano Island. A deformed and relatively thin (0.3–0.8 TWT) sedimentary layer covers almost all the subsurface areas. The scarce but still existing missing of part of the arc ridge offshore is result from extensional tectonic activities together with compression partitioning.

=== Forearc basin ===
All the basement can be easily realized based on strong multiple reflections from the seafloor except some places in the north part because of the existing of some down faulted continental blocks. There is a main normal fault correlated along the Sumatra region. Offshore Sumatra continental basement underlies the seaward propagating wedges. The basin in southern Sumatra is greatly influenced by anticlines and fault zones.

=== North Sumatra region ===
The North Sumatra region is defined here as the segment between 2.4–6°N. Accretionary wedges and forearcs here are very broad. A steep toe also presents. Average accretionary wedge has a width about 155–163 km, and the forearc basin has about 100–140 km thickness. Superficial average slope is about 1.2–1.3° while the outer part (about 50 km) becomes extremely steeper (3.3–3.9°) compare to the rest. Landward vergence of thrust folds, primarily frontal fold vergence is the most ubiquitous tectonic event happens at the prism bottom. Several landward vergences have been transformed into seaward. Seaward vergence is common further into the prism while landward vergent structures are more rare. The unusual structure here results in not only a strong wedge interior, but also tendency of a duplex deformation.

=== Central Sumatra region ===
The central region is from 3°S–2°N in the area near Simeulue island (2–2.5°N). The prism narrows greatly with the increasing of average surface slope. This is an indication of the existence of a transition zone between North and Central Sumatra regions. In the Central Sumatra region, a wide basement high, which has connections with the N–S trending fracture zone, is being subducted and causing the generation of variations in sediment thickness across the oceanic plate. The transition zone in the Central Sumatra region is defined as 2–2.5°N, based on the abruptly changes of structure, morphology and sediment changes. The structure and morphology begin to change at 2.4°N but the sediment thickness remains unchanged until 2°N. Prism width decreases from 150 km to 100 km over less than 100 km strike during the surface slope increases from 1° to 3°. This region has variable oceanic plate topography, sediment component and seafloor hardness. Because as it goes further and further from the Bengal Fan source, the ridge and basement structure together with sediment thickness keep changing. Changes in prism morphology southward are gradual and an alternative boundary can be determined at 4–5°S, at this area the seafloor hardness is decreasing and deformation front heads towards sea.

=== South Sumatra region ===
The South Sumatra region is from 5–7°S. The prism broaden from 115 kn to 140 km in this area, where surface slope decreases to 2°. This transition is gradual from north to south thanks to the decreasing effects of basement topography. From south of Enggano Island (6°S), the prism can be divided into 3 regions along the strike, each of it has shallower landward slope than the next. This is consistent with the presence of the slope break at about 30 km. A similar prism with mixed vergence of prism toe thrust folds exists north of the Enggano island.

== Sediment ==
=== Sediment thickness ===
The trench sediment thickness is primarily based on three factors: distance from the source, oceanic plate topography and the ability of basement barriers to stop sediment from transporting southward.

It is widely agreed that the sediments on the trench come from the Bengal Fan and Nicobar Fan. So the decreasing water depth from south to north indicates the distance from the source. So the sediment thickness can reflect the proximity of the region to the source in general. But there are some exceptions exist in nearby regions like Andaman where the eastern flank of the Ninety East Ridge can result in the reducing of the sediment thickness. The thickness is minimum at South Sumatra (1–2 km) and maximum at north Sumatra. The thickest sediment at north Sumatra can compare with the Makran Trench, which has the thickest sediment on Earth (7.5 km).

Sediment thickness along the Sumatra Trench varies significantly, which is the result of fracture zones and fossil ridges' influence on basement topography. The thickness is a function of oceanic basement topography in some extent and this feature is extremely distinctive in the part between Simeulue and Siberut Islands (Central Sumatra region 2°N to 3°S) along the trench. This sediment thickness variation then leads to thin and variable sediment cover in many places, sometimes hinders the sediment transportation along the Sumatra Trench. Generally the prism width increases with sediment input, there are a few anomalies in the central Sumatra region due to basement topography, i.e., the current sediment thickness is larger than the long-term average.

There are also many correlations between convergence and thickness. Particular in some places near north Sumatra, where prism toe vergence accompanies with very thick sedimentation. On the other hand, the narrowing and steepening of the prism and toe vergence together often correlate with reduced thickness on Central Sumatra region. This is where structural convergence and distance from the source function together to determine the sediment thickness. Usually when thickness is 3–4 km thick, landward vergence exists; seaward vergence is dominant when it's 1–1.5 km thick; and if thickness is between these two segments, mixed vergence can be observed. As an example of mixed and variable convergence, Central Sumatra region (sediment thickness is ~1–3 km) may has basement topography as a more dominant factor.

Region	Latitude (deg)	Prism width (km)	Prism surface slope (deg)	Trench sediment thickness (Km)
North Sumatra	2.4–6	155–165	1.2–1.8	4–5
Central Sumatra 1	0–2	100	2.7	2–4
Central Sumatra 2	3–0	125	2.4	1–2.5
North Sumatra	5–7	115–140	2.1	1–2

=== Sediment properties ===
Sediment properties related not only with sediment rate or source, but also with depth (thickness) related thermal diagenetic and metamorphic reactions, oceanic basement processes. Other factors such as prism structure and morphology also influence sediment properties.

In the north Sumatra region, where sediment is thick and prism wedge is wide, the dip is always shallow and landward vergence in toe is ubiquitous. it can generate high temperatures to dehydrate clays and strengthening the section. In south Sumatra region, topography and basement thickness is also very variable and overlaps with the region where prism is narrow and steep. Overall, the variations of material properties of sediments in Sumatra Trench is a result of structural variations along the trench.
