= Tiger Creek =

Tiger Creek may refer to:

- Tiger Creek (Florida), a stream in Polk County
- Tiger Creek (Georgia), a stream in Catoosa and Whitfield counties
