= HMS Tigre =

HMS Tigre may refer to:

- HMS Tigre (1762), a 74-gun ship of the line of the Spanish Navy launched in 1747, captured by the Royal Navy on 13 August 1762.
- HMS Tigre (1795), a 74-gun ship of the line of the French Navy captured by the British in the Battle of Groix.

== See also ==
- HMS Tiger
- Tigre (disambiguation)
- French ship Tigre
