= Tigray (disambiguation) =

Tigray is a region in northern Ethiopia.

Tigray may also refer to

== Places ==
- Tigray Province, a province of Ethiopia until 1995

== People ==
- Tigrayan-Tigrinya people (disambiguation)
  - Tigrayans, an ethnographic group in Ethiopia
  - Tigrinya people, an ethnographic group in Eritrea

=== Languages ===
- Tigrinya language, a language spoken by Tigrayans

== See also ==
- Tigray War
- Tigre (disambiguation)
