= Tony the Tiger (disambiguation) =

Tony the Tiger is the advertising cartoon mascot for Kellogg's Frosted Flakes breakfast cereal.

"Tony the Tiger" may also refer to:

- Tony Clark, a former baseball player who spent much of his career with the Detroit Tigers
- Tony Lopez (boxer), a former professional boxer from Sacramento, California
- Tony Stewart, the NASCAR Sprint Cup Driver from Columbus, Indiana
- Tony Thompson (boxer), a professional heavyweight boxer from Maryland
- Tony Sbalbi, French ski mountaineer

== See also ==
- Tiger (disambiguation)
