= Tiger 2 =

Tiger 2 may refer to:

- Tiger II, a German heavy tank of World War II
- Tiger Zinda Hai or Tiger 2, a 2017 Indian spy film by Ali Abbas Zafar, second in the Tiger film series

== See also ==
- Tiger 1 (disambiguation)
- Tiger 3, a 2023 Indian spy film, sequel to Tiger 2
