= La Tigra =

La Tigra may refer to:

- La Tigra, Chaco, a locality and municipality in Chaco Province, Argentina
- La Tigra, San Carlos, a district of San Carlos Canton, Alajuela Province, Costa Rica
- La Tigra National Park, in Honduras

== See also ==
- Le Tigre
