= Tiger Lake (Carver County, Minnesota) =

Lake in the state of Minnesota, United States

- Location within Minnesota
- Location: Carver County, Minnesota
- Coordinates: 44°46′33″N 93°57′17″W
- Type: lake

Tiger Lake is a lake in Carver County, Minnesota, in the United States.

Tiger Lake was named from early sightings of mountain lions near this lake.

== See also ==
- List of lakes in Minnesota
