= Nuno Lopes (footballer, born 1998) =

Portuguese footballer

Tiger
Personal information
- Full name: Nuno André Fernandes Lopes
- Date of birth: 27 November 1998 (age 27)
- Place of birth: Braga, Portugal
- Height: 1.73 m (5 ft 8 in)
- Position: Midfielder

Team information
- Current team: Brito SC

Youth career
- 2008–2012: Braga
- 2012–2014: Esc. Fernando Pires
- 2014–2017: Gil Vicente

Senior career*
Years	Team	Apps	(Gls)
2017–	Gil Vicente	8	(0)
2018–2019	→ Santa Maria (loan)	18	(3)
2019–	→ Brito SC (loan)	5	(1)
- * Club domestic league appearances and goals as of 20 October 2019

Nuno André Fernandes Lopes, known as Tiger (born 27 November 1998) is a Portuguese professional footballer who plays for Brito SC on loan from Gil Vicente as a midfielder.

== Club career ==
On 19 August 2017, Lopes made his professional debut with Gil Vicente in a 2017–18 LigaPro match against Varzim. He currently plays for Brito SC.
