= Tiger Band =

Tiger Band is a nickname shared by a few collegiate marching bands:

- Louisiana State University Tiger Marching Band
- Princeton University Band
- Clemson University Tiger Band
