= Tiger 1 =

Tiger 1 may refer to:

- Tiger I, a German heavy tank of World War II
- Ek Tha Tiger or Tiger 1, a 2012 Indian spy film by Kabir Khan, first in the Tiger film series

== See also ==
- Tiger 2 (disambiguation)
