= Domeyko Fault =

Geological fault in Northern Chile

The Domeyko Fault (Spanish: Falla Domeyko) or Precordilleran Fault System is a geological fault located in Northern Chile. The fault is of the strike-slip type and runs parallel to the Andes, the coast and the nearby Atacama Fault. The fault originated in the Eocene. Along its length the Domeyko Fault hosts several porphyry copper deposits including Chuquicamata, Collahuasi, El Abra, El Salvador, La Escondida and Potrerillos. The fault is named after 19th century geologist Ignacy Domeyko.

== See also ==
- Chilean Iron Belt
- Copper mining in Chile
- Copperbelt
- El Indio Gold Belt
- Maricunga Gold Belt
