= Tigas =

Group of independent pharmacies in Malaysia

The Tigas logo

Tigas Alliance (pronounced "tee-gas") is a banner group of independent pharmacies in Malaysia. Tigas was formed in 2004, with 20 stores. In 2011, Tigas has grown to more than 70 stores in Malaysia. Tigas is situated in neighbourhood and suburb locations throughout the country. Each pharmacy is operated by qualified pharmacists who are available during pharmacy opening hours.

== Store profile ==
Tigas stores are typically owner-operated by the pharmacists themselves, each focusing on pharmacy community services in and around their local neighbourhoods.

Tigas stores services customers with drugs, over-the-counter (OTC) medications and fast-moving consumer goods (FMCG).

== History ==
The name "Tigas" is derived from "Tiga" in the Malay language (Bahasa Malaysia), meaning "three", and "S" is the acronym for Supply-chain stakeholders, symbolic of the three links in the pharmacy supply-chain: better preventive health, connecting pharmacists to consumers and health solutions.

The Tigas concept is similar to the banner pharmacy groups in existence in US, UK and Australia. Banner pharmacy groups refer to large-scale alliances between independent pharmacies, coming together under an umbrella brand to take advantage of economies of scale in purchasing, coordinated promotions and cohesive marketing programmes.

The Tigas marketing concept allows for its pharmacy members to enjoy a loyalty card program, together with increased patronage from consumers by acting as fulfilment points for wellness programs, drug dispensing programs and healthcare benefits programs.
