= Tiger Lake (Redwood County, Minnesota) =

Lake in the state of Minnesota, United States

- Location within Minnesota
- Location: Redwood County, Minnesota
- Coordinates: 44°32′52″N 95°2′33″W
- Type: lake

Tiger Lake is a lake in Redwood County, in the U.S. state of Minnesota.

According to Warren Upham, Tiger Lake was probably named on account of settlers seeing cougars in the area.

== See also ==
- List of lakes in Minnesota
