= Tiger Cave =

Tiger Cave may refer to:

- Tiger Cave Kiln, China
- Tiger Cave (India)
- Tiger Cave Temple, Thailand
