= HMS Tiger =

Fifteen ships of the British Royal Navy have carried the name HMS Tiger after the feline tiger, with a number of others provisionally bearing the name at various stages in their construction:

'HMS' – the abbreviation for 'His' or 'Her Majesty's Ship' is an anachronism before about 1820, when it became a common use by ship commanders; its accepted use by the Admiralty did not happen until some years later.

- Tiger (1546) was a 22-gun ship built in 1546, rebuilt in 1570, which was the flagship of the 1586 expedition to the Roanoke Colony. In use as a floating battery after 1600, she was condemned in 1605.
- English ship Tiger (1613) was a discovery vessel recorded in the Arctic in 1613.
- English ship Tyger (1647) was a 32-gun ship launched in 1647, rebuilt in 1681, 1701, 1705 and 1721, and wrecked in 1742.
- HMS Tiger was a 50-gun fourth rate renamed Harwich shortly before launching in 1743. She was wrecked in 1760.
- HMS Tiger (1747) was a 60-gun fourth rate launched in 1747. She was hulked in 1761 and sold in Bombay in 1765.
- HMS Tiger (1762) was a 74-gun third rate, previously the Spanish Tigre. She was captured in 1762 and sold in 1784.
- HMS Tiger was a 64-gun third rate launched in 1764 as HMS Ardent. She was captured by the French in 1764, but was recaptured in 1782 and renamed HMS Tiger. She was sold in 1784.
- HMS Tiger was to have been a 50-gun fourth rate, but she was renamed HMS Grampus before her launch in 1802.
- HMS Tiger (1794) was a 4-gun hoy purchased in 1794 and sold in 1798.
- HMS Tigre (1795) was an 80-gun second rate captured from the French in 1795. She was broken up by 1817.
- HMS Tiger (1808) was a 12-gun brig in service from 1808 to 1812.
- HMS Tiger (1849) was a wooden-hulled paddle sloop launched in 1849, reclassified as a frigate in 1852, and was destroyed in action with the Russians off Odessa in 1854.
- HMS Tiger (1900) was a C-class destroyer launched in 1900. She was sunk in 1908 in a collision with the cruiser HMS Berwick.
- HMS Tiger (1913) was a battlecruiser launched in 1913 and scrapped in 1932.
- HMS Tiger was to have been a Minotaur-class light cruiser. She was initially ordered in 1942, but renamed HMS Bellerophon later that year and was laid down in 1944. She was renamed HMS Blake in 1944, HMS Bellerophon again in 1945 and was cancelled in 1946.
- HMS Tiger was another proposed Minotaur-class cruiser, initially ordered as HMS Blake. She was renamed HMS Tiger in 1944, and then HMS Blake again in 1945. After work was suspended in 1946, she was completed and launched in 1961 as HMS Blake.
- HMS Tiger (C20) was another Minotaur-class cruiser, initially ordered as HMS Bellerophon. She was renamed and launched as HMS Tiger in 1945. She was laid up in 1946 and completed in 1959 as a Tiger-class cruiser. She was scrapped in 1986.

== Battle honours ==
Ships named Tiger have earned the following battle honours:

- Armada, 1588
- Portland, 1653
- Gabbard, 1653
- Scheveningen, 1653
- Lowestoft, 1665
- Orfordness, 1666
- Sole Bay, 1672
- Marbella, 1705
- Sadras, 1758
- Negapatam, 1758
- Porto Novo, 1759
- Basque Roads, 1809
- Dogger Bank, 1915
- Jutland, 1916

== See also ==
- HMS Tiger Bay
- HMS Tigress
- HMS Tigre
