= Tiger Tiger =

Tiger Tiger may refer to:

== Literature ==
- "The Tyger", a 1794 poem by William Blake, which opens with "Tyger Tyger"
- "Tiger! Tiger!" (Kipling short story), an 1893/1894 Mowgli story by Rudyard Kipling
- Tiger! Tiger!, original title of the Alfred Bester novel retitled The Stars My Destination
- "Tiger! Tiger!", a 2003 short story by Elizabeth Bear in Shadows Over Baker Street
- Tiger, Tiger! Princeton in Caricature by William F. Brown (writer)
- Tiger, Tiger: A Memoir, 2011 autobiography by Margaux Fragoso
- Tiger, Tiger (book), a 2024 non-fiction book by James Patterson and Peter de Jonge
- Tiger, Tiger (webcomic), webcomic by Petra Erika Nordlund

== Music ==
- "Tiger Tiger", a song by Duran Duran from the 1983 album Seven and the Ragged Tiger
- "Tiger! Tiger!", a song by Slough Feg from the 2008 album Hardworlder.
- "Tiger, Tiger", a song from the musical The Apple Tree

== Other uses ==
- Tiger Tiger (nightclub), a British nightclub chain
- Tyger Tyger (film), a 2021 pandemic thriller
- An alternative name for tiger tail ice cream, a Canadian orange-flavoured ice cream with black liquorice swirl

== See also ==
- Tiger (disambiguation)
- Tora! Tora! Tora!
- Tyger Tiger, or Jessan Hoan, a Marvel Comics book character
