= Tiger (nickname) =

Tiger or Tyger, as a nickname, may refer to:

== Artists and entertainers ==
- Tiger Haynes (1914–1994), American actor and musical performer
- Tiger Onitsuka (born 1998), Japanese jazz drummer
- Tiger Prabhakar (1948–2001), Indian actor in Kannada cinema
- Tiger Shroff (born 1990), Indian actor
- Tiger Varadachariar (1876–1950), Indian musician

== Athletes ==
- Tiger Black (1918–1983), Australian rugby league player and commentator
- Tyger Campbell (born 2000), American basketball player
- Tiger Chen (born 1975), Chinese martial artist and actor
- Brent Crosswell (born 1950), Australian rules footballer
- Tiger Flowers (1895–1927), African-American middleweight boxing champion
- Tiger Jack Fox (1907–1954), American light heavyweight boxer
- Tiger Greene (born 1962), former National Football League player
- Tiger Lance (1940–2010), South African cricketer
- Nuno Lopes (footballer, born 1998), Portuguese footballer known as Tiger
- Tiger Mangweni (born 1980), South African rugby union player
- Dariusz Michalczewski (born 1968), Polish-German boxer
- Bill O'Reilly (cricketer) (1905–1992), Australian cricketer
- Mansoor Ali Khan Pataudi (1941–2011), Indian cricketer
- Ian Ridley (1934–2008), Australian rules footballer
- Tiger Shanks (born 2002), Canadian football player
- Jock Shaw (1912–2000), Scottish footballer
- Tiger Smalls (born 1969), former featherweight boxing champion
- Tiger Smith (1886–1979), English cricketer
- Tiger Stevenson (1907–?), English motorcycle speedway racer
- Tiger Williams (born 1954), Canadian former National Hockey League player
- Tiger Woods (born 1975), American golfer

== Others ==
- William "Tiger" Dunlop (1792–1848), army and militia officer, surgeon, Canada Company official, author and politician
- Tiger Memon (born 1960), Indian gangster
- Ralph Thomas (born 1938), activist and former amateur boxer who went by the nickname "Tiger"
- The Tiger, the nickname of a North Korean colonel who presided over the Tiger Death March during the Korean War
- Avinash Singh Rathore or Tiger, a fictional Research and Analysis Wing spy portrayed by Salman Khan in the Tiger franchise

== See also ==
- Georges Clemenceau (1841–1929), French Prime Minister, known as "Le Tigre" ("The Tiger")
- Tiger of Malaya, nickname of Tomoyuki Yamashita (1885–1946), Japanese general
- Tiger of Malaya, nickname of Gerald Templer, British general
