= Ergak-Targak-Taiga =

The Egrak-Targak-Taiga (Russian: Ерга́к-Тарга́к-Тайга́, Khakas: Ырғах-тарғах тасхыл, romanized: Irğax-tarğax tasxıl) or Tazarama is a mountain range in Eastern Siberia, Russia. It is located in Krasnoyarsk Krai and the Republic of Tuva.

== Geography ==
The mountain range is located in the north-eastern part of the Western Sayan Mountains system at the junction with the Eastern Sayan, between the upper reaches of the rivers Us and Kazyr. The mountain range stretches for over 200 km (124 mi) reach up to 2,504 m in levation. It is mainly composed of metamorphic schists and granites. The medium mountain relief is prevalent; on the slopes (up to an altitude of about 1,800 m) there is dark coniferous taiga (Siberian cedar and pine), subalpine meadows and, at higher elevations, high mountain tundra and scree.

A large part of the range is included in the Ergaki Nature Park.
