= Operation Tiger =

Operation Tiger may refer to:

- Operation Tiger (Java), a series of Australian reconnaissance missions during World War II
- Fortified Sector of the Sarre#Operation Tiger (1940), a successful German assault during the Battle of France
- Operation Tiger (1941), a Malta convoy during World War II
- Exercise Tiger (1942), an Army-level military exercise in the UK during World War II
- Exercise Tiger (1944), disastrous practice exercise for the Allied invasion of Normandy in World War II
- Operation Tiger (1984), prosecution of London's Gay's the Word bookshop for obscene literature
- Operation Tiger (1992), or Tigar, a Croatian Army offensive ending the Siege of Dubrovnik in the Croatian War of Independence
- Operation Tiger (1994), an Army of the Republic of Bosnia and Herzegovina operation against the Autonomous Province of Western Bosnia during the Bosnian War
- Operation Tiger, a video game in the Operation Wolf series
