= Tiger Creek (Georgia) =

Unincorporated community in the state of Georgia

Coordinates: 34°54′18″N 85°04′54″W

Tiger Creek is a stream in Catoosa County and Whitfield County, Georgia, in the United States.

Tiger Creek was named for a member of the Cherokee tribe.

== See also ==
- List of rivers of Georgia (U.S. state)
