= TIGR plant repeat database =

The TIGR Plant Repeat Databases
Content
- Description: repetitive sequences in plants.
- Organisms: plants

Contact
- Research center: The Institute for Genomic Research
- Authors: Shu Ouyang
- Primary citation: Ouyang & al. (2004)

Access
- Website: http://plantrepeats.plantbiology.msu.edu/index.html

The TIGR plant repeat database is a repository of repetitive sequences in plants.

== See also ==
- repetitive sequences
- TIGR plant transcript assembly database
