= TIGR plant transcript assembly database =

TIGR Plant Transcript Assemblies database.
Content
- Description: Plant transcript assemblies
- Organisms: plants

Contact
- Laboratory: The Institute for Genomic Research
- Primary citation: Childs & al. (2007)
- Release date: 2006

Access
- Website: http://plantta.tigr.org

The TIGR Plant Transcript Assemblies database in computational biology is a repository of sequences collected for the construction of transcript assemblies.

== See also ==
- TIGR plant repeat database
