= Tiger Division =

Tiger Division may refer to:

- 88th Division (National Revolutionary Army), China (1932–1948)
- 373rd (Croatian) Infantry Division (Wehrmacht) (1943–1945)
- Capital Mechanized Infantry Division, Republic of Korea (formed 1948)
- 19th Division (Imperial Japanese Army) (1915–1945)
- 10th Armored Division (United States) (1942–1945)

== See also ==
- 31st Indian Armoured Division, White Tiger Division (1940–1945)
