= French ship Tigre =

At least four ships of the French Navy have been named Tigre:

- French ship Tigre (1642), a 28-gun small ship of the line launched in 1642 and foundered in 1644.
- French ship Tigre (1793), a 74-gun ship of the line launched in 1793 and captured by the Royal Navy in 1795.
- French ship Tigre (1871), a wooden-hulled armoured ram of the Cerbère class, launched in 1871 and broken up in 1892.
- French destroyer Tigre, a Chacal-class destroyer launched in 1924, acquired by Italy in 1942 returned to French service in 1943 and scrapped in 1955.

== See also ==
- HMS Tigre
