= Tiger Corporation =

Japanese home appliance company

- Native name: タイガー魔法瓶株式会社
- Type: Private
- Industry: Home appliance
- Founded: February 3, 1923; 103 years ago
- Founder: Takenori Kikuchi
- Headquarters: Kadoma City, Osaka Prefecture, Japan
- Area served: Worldwide
- Key people: Yoshisato Kikuchi (President)
- Products: Vacuum bottles; Small appliances
- Revenue: JPY 43.8 billion (FY 2017) (US$ 413 million) (FY 2017)
- Website: Official website

Tiger Corporation (Japanese: タイガー魔法瓶株式会社, romanized: Taigā Mahōbin Kabushiki Gaisha, lit. 'Tiger Vacuum Flask [Magic-jar] Corporation') is a Japanese manufacturer that applies vacuum insulation and heat control technology to consumer electronic appliances. Their headquarters are located in Kadoma City in Osaka, Japan. The company manufactures and sells appliances such as household and commercial vacuum insulated containers and stainless-steel bottles, along with cooking appliances such as rice cookers. The company also manufactures industrial parts and products used in automobiles, homes, air conditioners, space, and medical care in 60 countries around the world.

In 2018, Tiger Corporation collaborated with Japan Aerospace Exploration Agency (JAXA) on jointly developing a “Double-Layered Vacuum Insulation Container,” a small collection capsule. It has successfully re-entered Earth’s atmosphere without harming the experimental samples from the International Space Station (ISS), opening a new plan for taking samples from space.

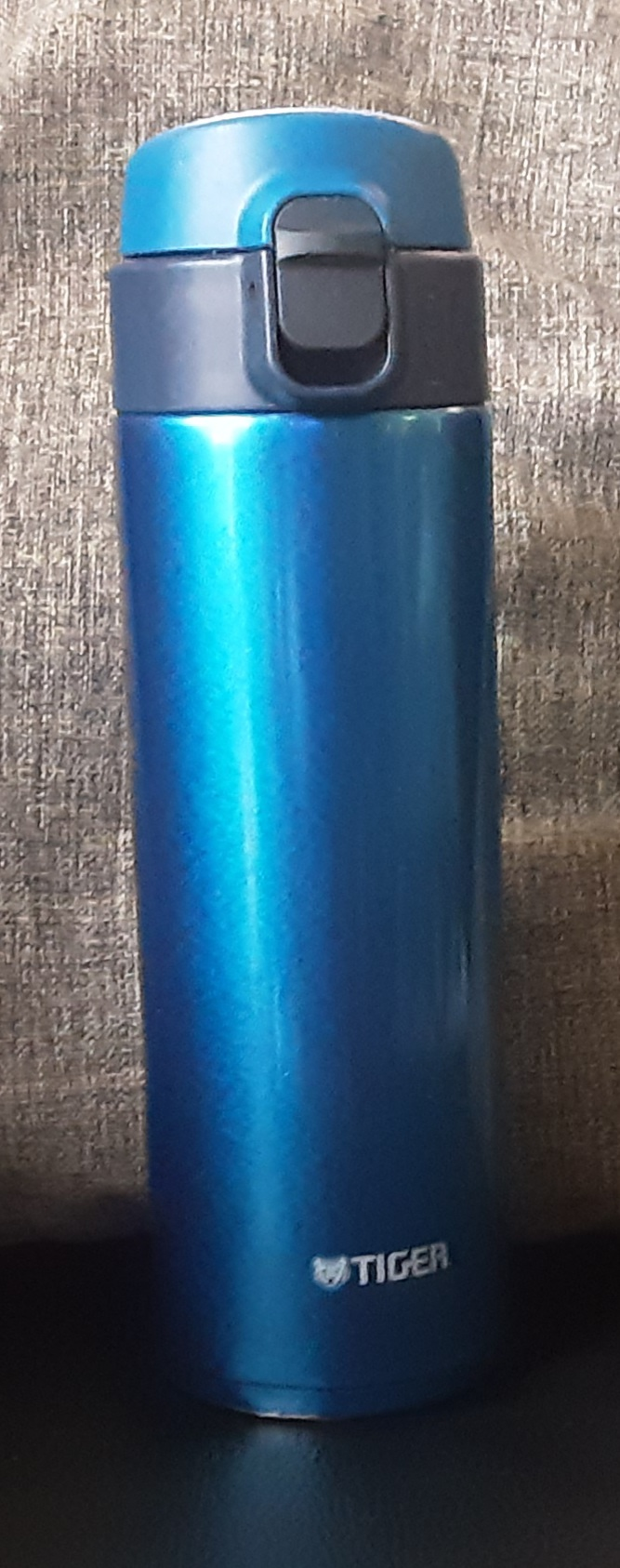
A Tiger Corp. Stainless Steel Bottle

== History ==
The company was founded in February 1923 as Kikuchi Manufacturing Company in Nishi-ku, Osaka and manufactured Tiger brand vacuum flasks. In 1953, the company's name was changed to Tiger Vacuum Bottle Ind, Co., Ltd., and in 1983 to Tiger Vacuum Bottle Co., Ltd., and from 1999 to its present name, Tiger Magic-jar Corporation.

In 1923, Tiger Corporation was established in Osaka by Takenori Kikuchi.

At the time, most vacuum bottles were made of glass and very fragile. With much trial and error, Takenori thought of placing a layer of cardboard between the inner and outer containers to protect the glass. When Japan suffered the Great Kanto Earthquake also in 1923, only Tiger vacuum bottles remained intact among the different products on shop shelves.

Tiger’s thermos bottle technology was also used in space experiments. Tiger was in charge of the development of vacuum double insulated containers storing precious space experiment samples in a HTV Small Re-entry Capsule (developed for installation in the space station refueling machine Kounotori 7) bringing supplies from the International Space Station (ISS) to the Earth.

On November 11, 2018, the HTV Small Re-entry Capsule returned to the Earth withstanding the strong impact during landing while keeping the experimental samples from the International Space Station at about 4 °C.

== Products ==
As of 2006, Tiger produces and markets rice cookers, vacuum flasks (thermoses), electric barbecue grills, insulated jugs, insulated lunch boxes, ice buckets (pails), electric mochi makers, mochi cutters, and air purifiers with ionizers.
