= Suburban (1911 automobile) =

Defunct American motor vehicle manufacturer

The Suburban Motor Car Company of Detroit MI specialized in small 2-seater roadsters. It was powered with a 4-cylinder 20 hp engine for the smaller car. The 6-cylinder 28 hp engine powered a race car which cost $1200.
