= Tiger (automobile) =

Defunct American motor vehicle manufacturer

The Tiger was a cyclecar built by the Automobile Cyclecar Co. of Detroit, Michigan, in 1914. The Tiger was manufactured as both a 2-seater and a 4-seater car, and was powered by a 4-cylinder Farmer engine with overhead valves and a drive shaft.
