= El Tigre Fault =

Seismically active fault in Argentina

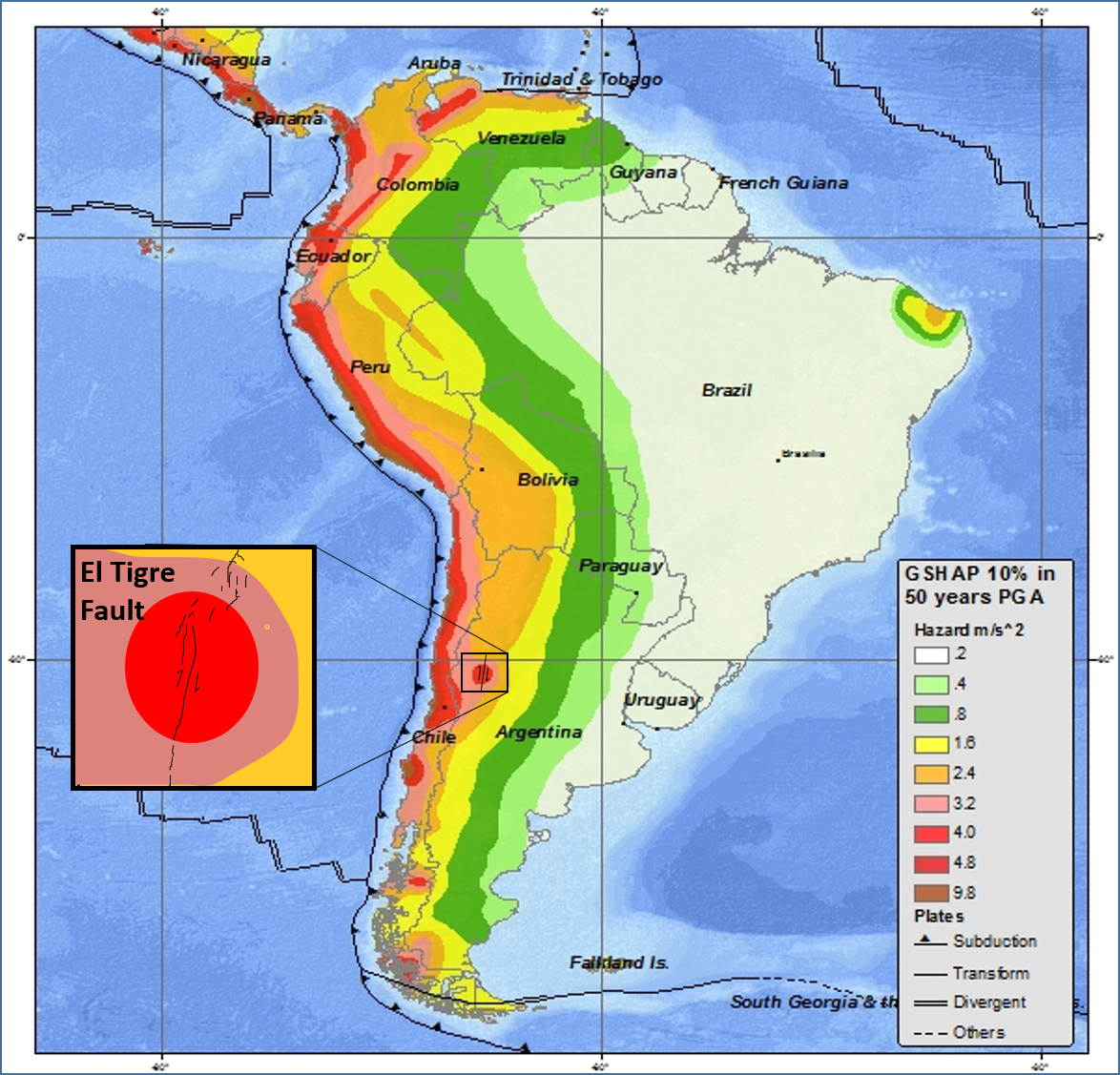
South America seismic hazard map with estimated El Tigre Fault location inset. Adapted from illustrations

The El Tigre Fault is a 120 km long, roughly north-south trending, major strike-slip fault located in the Western Precordillera in Argentina. The Precordillera lies just to the east of the Andes mountain range in South America. The northern boundary of the fault is the Jáchal River and its southern boundary is the San Juan River. The fault is divided into three sections based on fault trace geometry, Northern extending between 41–46 km in length, Central extending between 48–53 km in length, and Southern extending 26 km in length. The fault displays a right-lateral (horizontal) motion and has formed in response to stresses from the Nazca Plate subducting under the South American Plate. It is a major fault with crustal significance. The Andes Mountain belt trends with respect to the Nazca Plate/South American Plate convergence zone, and deformation is divided between the Precordilleran thrust faults and the El Tigre strike-slip motion. The El Tigre Fault is currently seismically active.

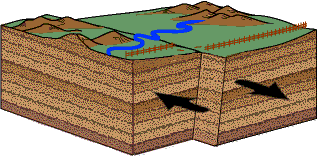
Right lateral strike-slip fault with observable displacement

== Geology ==
El Tigre Fault is a right-lateral N10°E trending fault, known for its good grade of exposures and markers of horizontal displacement. Its linear traces are apparent throughout the length of the fault. Morphology of El Tigre strike-slip fault is visible on the western slope of the Precordillera fold and thrust belt. With evidence of activity during the Middle Pleistocene to present day, it is considered a Quaternary fault. Geomorphic and ^{10}Be (Beryllium) exposure ages have been used in some studies to estimate the Quaternary age and slip rate. Slip rate is estimated to be approximately 1 mm/year and offsets range from 60 to 180 m.

The Nazca/South American oblique convergence zone off Chile is N76° and El Tigre releases the north-south stress component of continental plate motion at about 30°-31°. In the San Juan Province, it is part of an east-verging thin-skinned belt, and is located in a major active seismic area. Moment magnitude estimates reveal that a 7 ± 0.5 scale earthquake could be produced.

== Fault zones ==
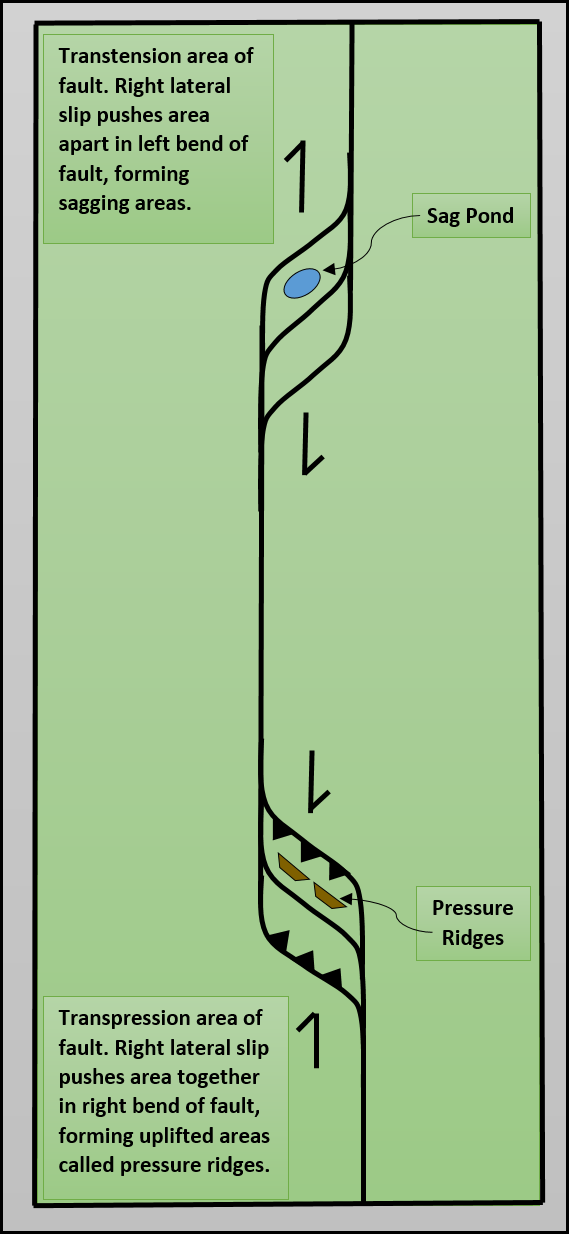
Transtension and transpression of a right lateral fault. Combined data from illustrations and text.

=== Northern ===
The northern subdivision is approximately 41–46 km long. One estimation shows the segment begins where the fault bends to the northeast and is 41 km long. Another estimation places the distinction 5.5 km south of this bend resulting in the northern segment 46 km long. This section is more structurally complex than the central and southern sections, due to the segment's northern edge ending in a horse tail termination. This faulted area can be interpreted from the 1 km to 5 km separation of several disperse rupture strands.

=== Central ===
The central subdivision is approximately 48–53 km long. This area exhibits transpressive and transtensive geomorphological features. Sag ponds (releasing basins) form when the right lateral fault bends to the left causing the crust to extend (transtensive). Pressure ridges form when the right-lateral fault bends to the right causing the crust to compress (transpressive). A bedrock scarp with an east-facing slope shows vertical displacement along this part of the fault. The scarp has a slope of 18-24° and maximum height of 85 m. Tectonic shortening appears to have changed direction from WSW-ENE to W-E during the Pleistocene, altering the kinematics to the present transpressive and transtensive system from a mainly transcurrent one.

=== Southern ===
The southern subdivision is approximately 26 km long. This segment is characterized by the right-lateral offset of drainage networks. It exhibits an uninterrupted linear trace and strike-slip component that are useful in determining offset. The termination point for El Tigre in the south is recognized by a merging within the Precordilleran Paleozoic strata, as well as its extremely disturbed surface deformation. By dating the alluvial fans in this segment, some studies conclude a horizontal displacement rate of approximately 1 mm/yr. The southern segment along with the central segment are crossed by several oblique and transverse faults almost perpendicular to the El Tigre Fault. These faults are inferred due to the long linear strands of stream channels, as the faults are not visible on the surface.

== Discrepancies ==
The faults location in a seismically active zone and a low erosional environment makes it a good study area. Although many characteristics of geomorphology have been preserved, the area has not been extensively studied using the new methodologies currently available. The fault has sparked new interest in its geometrical and kinematic characteristics within recent years. Previous studies on the El Tigre Fault have a range of inconstancies. Information obtained on the fault can vary from a reactivated fault with a normal component in Jurassic and Palaeocene, an Eocene strike-slip fault, an Oligocene northwest-verging thrust fault, and a south-east dipping normal fault inverted in the Neogene. Research models in the 1980s describe the fault as system anywhere from 800 km up to 1000 km in length. The kinematics, geometry, extension, and deformation have not been widely agreed upon, therefore the new interest in the El Tigre Fault should lead to further studies using modern technology. These future studies should shed light on the discrepancies that have resulted from lack of in depth information in the past.
