= Spanish ship Tigre (1747) =

Ship of the line of the Spanish Navy

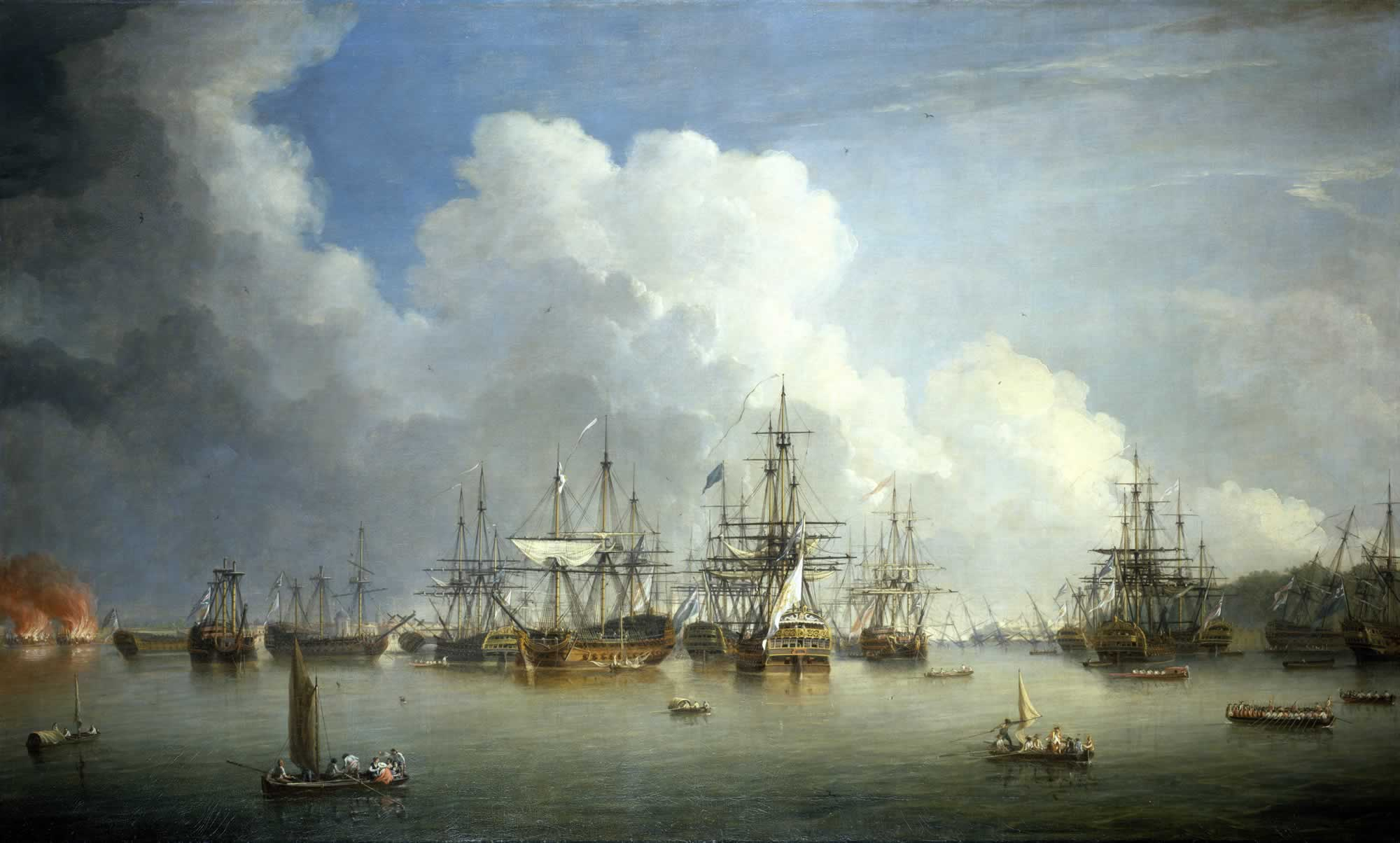
- Painting by Dominic Serres depicting captured Spanish warships at Havana; Tigre is possibly among them

History

Spain
- Name: Tigre
- Launched: 1747
- Captured: 13 August 1762, by Royal Navy

Great Britain
- Name: HMS Tigre
- Acquired: 13 August 1762
- Fate: Sold, 10 June 1784

General characteristics
- Class & type: 70-gun ship of the line
- Tons burthen: 1886 tons
- Length: 169 ft 3 in (51.6 m) (gundeck)
- Beam: 51 ft (15.5 m)
- Depth of hold: 21 ft 8 in (6.6 m)
- Propulsion: Sails
- Sail plan: Full-rigged ship
- Armament: 70 guns of various weights of shot

Tigre was a 70-gun ship of the line of the Spanish Navy. Launched in 1747, she was captured by the Royal Navy on 13 August 1762, and commissioned as the 74-gun third-rate HMS Tigre. She was sold out of the navy in 1784.
