= Tigrayan-Tigrinya people =

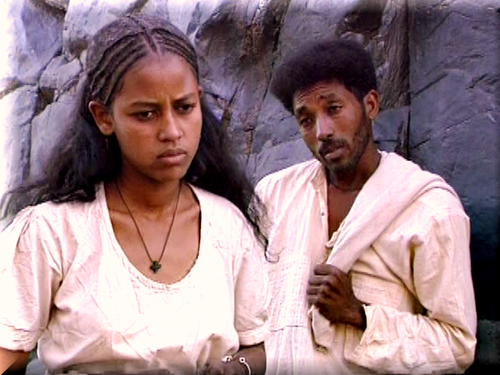
Tigrinya couple in Mendefera

Tigrayan-Tigrinya people or Tigray-Tigrinya people most often refers to Habesha peoples of the same ethnicity but different ethnographic groups of Ethiopia and Eritrea who traditionally speak the Tigrinya language:

- Tigrayans
- Tigrinya people
