= Magmatism along strike-slip faults =

Process of rock melting

Magmatism along strike-slip faults is the process of rock melting, magma ascent and emplacement, associated with the tectonics and geometry of various strike-slip settings, most commonly occurring along transform boundaries at mid-ocean ridge spreading centres and at strike-slip systems parallel to oblique subduction zones. Strike-slip faults have a direct effect on magmatism. They can either induce magmatism, act as a conduit to magmatism and magmatic flow, or block magmatic flow. In contrast, magmatism can also directly impact on strike-slip faults by determining fault formation, propagation and slip. Both magma and strike-slip faults coexist and affect one another.

== Strike-slip faults – overview ==
Strike-slip faults are commonly almost vertically inclined faults, where the main displacement and slip is in the horizontal direction, parallel to the strike of the fault. Depending on the movement of the fault blocks relative to the fault plane, strike-slip faults can be classified as either sinistral (left-lateral displacement) or dextral (right-lateral displacement). There are different kinds of strike-slip fault and settings in which they occur: continental and oceanic transform faults form in areas of plate divergence and sea floor spreading, strain-partitioned strike-slip faults can occur in both oceanic and continental crust at zones of oblique subduction.

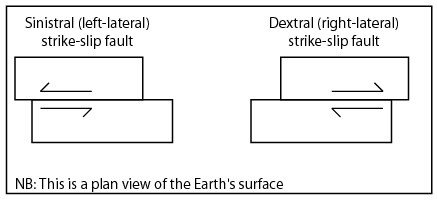
A simple diagram demonstrating the structure of strike-slip faults and their movement.

Typically, magmatism is not commonly associated with strike-slip regimes. It is more frequently associated with extensional and compressional regimes, which give rise to normal and reverse/thrust faults, respectively. In most cases, strike-slip faults only play a role in the migration of magma along their planes of weakness, rather than being directly responsible for the origin of magmatism. However, there are certain scenarios in which strike-slip movement and its associated features can induce magmatism. Examples include the Dead Sea Transform in the Middle East and the San Andreas Fault in California.

== Mechanisms of magmatism in areas of strike-slip tectonics ==
Magmatism is the process by which rock is heated deep in the earth's mantle or crust via different types of melting, forming magma, liquid or semi-liquid molten rock which buoyantly rises towards the earth's surface to either be intruded as an igneous body or extruded as lava. There are various mechanisms of rock melting that can be achieved in different stress regimes dependent on the tectonics of the region. Flux and decompression melting processes are typical of subduction zones or mid-ocean ridges, in compressional and extensional stress regimes. Strike-slip stress regimes can include components of extension and/or shortening, for example in transtensional or transpressional situations, which ultimately allow for the creation and accumulation of magma along strike-slip shear zones. Magma in several field studies is seen to exploit strike-slip faults of a continental scale, which begin during either collisional or extensional tectonics.

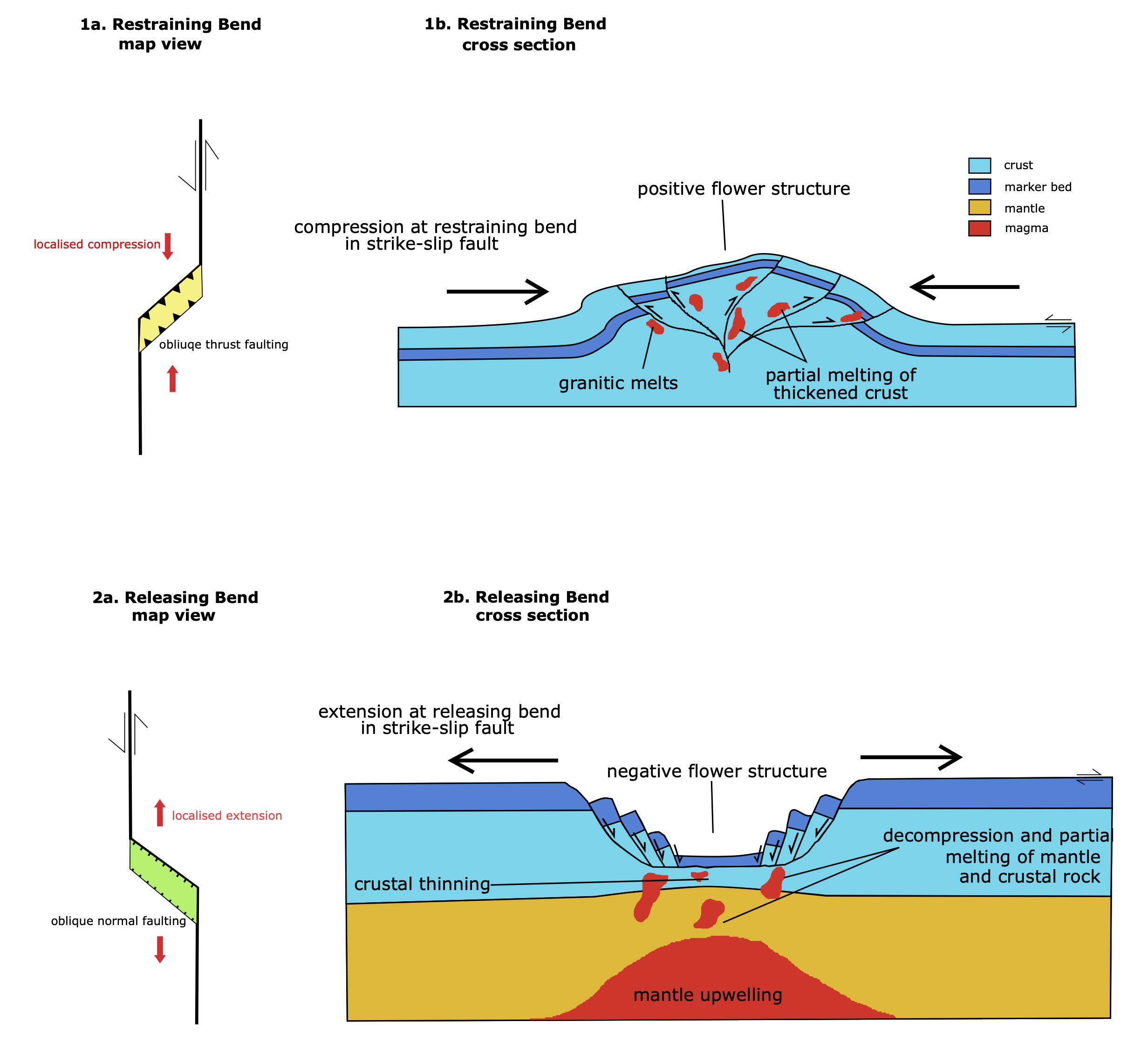
Figure shows how magma can be generated in transpressional (1a,b) or transtensional (2a,b) stress environments at strike-slip faults.

=== Transpression ===
Transpressional environments involve strike slip with a minor shortening/compressional component. Transpression is seen along bends in strike slip fault zones where the land is forced into each other and compressed. These bends, known as restraining bends, allow for contraction and transpression; they can cause topographic uplift, crustal shortening and exhumation of basement rocks. This geometry can result in localised volcanism along the strike-slip fault.

- Subduction and Flux Melting – Where subduction of oceanic lithosphere is occurring, magma forms via flux melting. Flux melting starts with the subduction of the hydrated oceanic slab. Hydrated minerals within the subducting lithosphere increase in temperature. This causes the hydrated minerals to emit volatiles – water vapour and gases – which are driven upward and dissolved into the mantle which lowers the melting temperature of constituent minerals, allowing them to melt to form magma.
- Compression and rock melting - In a high strain compressional environment, additional strain energy can increase melting of rock by overstepping the activation energy required to melt constituent minerals. Due to the thickening of Earth's crust that is related to transpression, granitic melts can be generated.

Activation energy is the minimum energy that must be exceeded in order for the rock minerals to melt. Activation energy breaks this barrier when there is significant kinetic energy, for example from the friction of rock collision. This kinetic energy can be converted into thermal energy resulting in frictional heating of the rock and melting of constituent minerals. This rock melting behaviour is usually associated with continental-continental collisions.

=== Transtension ===
Transtensional environments involve majority strike-slip with a minor extensional component. Slight bends in the strike-slip fault, called releasing bends, can accommodate transtension, and induce the formation of pull apart basins or transtensional basins along the fault plane. This geometry and the shearing motion of the two fault blocks causes extension of the crust.

- Extension and Decompression Melting - Decompression melting occurs mainly in extensional regimes, where the crust thins, allowing the mantle to upwell to an area of lower pressure where the melting point of the minerals is lower. The formation of pull-apart basins along strike-slip faults causes decompression melting. Advection of melts and heat flux into the lower crust results in partial melting of crustal rock. The buoyant magma rises due to its lower density and is able to exploit weaknesses such as fault planes, using strike-slips as conduits for motion.

=== Heat induced melting ===
Magmatism can occur in instances unrelated to the regional tectonics and stresses. This occurs due to exposure of the rock to higher temperatures, for example at mantle plumes. Mantle plumes are areas of the lower mantle significantly hotter than the mantle around it, which upwell towards the surface due to density contrasts. At the surface, the extremely high temperatures cause a rapid increase in the geothermal gradient, and so the rocks near the plume cross the solidus and melt. This type of magmatism is only related to strike-slip faults if they are present at the hotspot; for example magmatism is associated with the transform faults in Iceland, and magma injection from the hot spot can also trigger strike-slip motion and formation.

== Types of Strike-Slip Settings ==
=== Mid ocean ridge fault zones ===
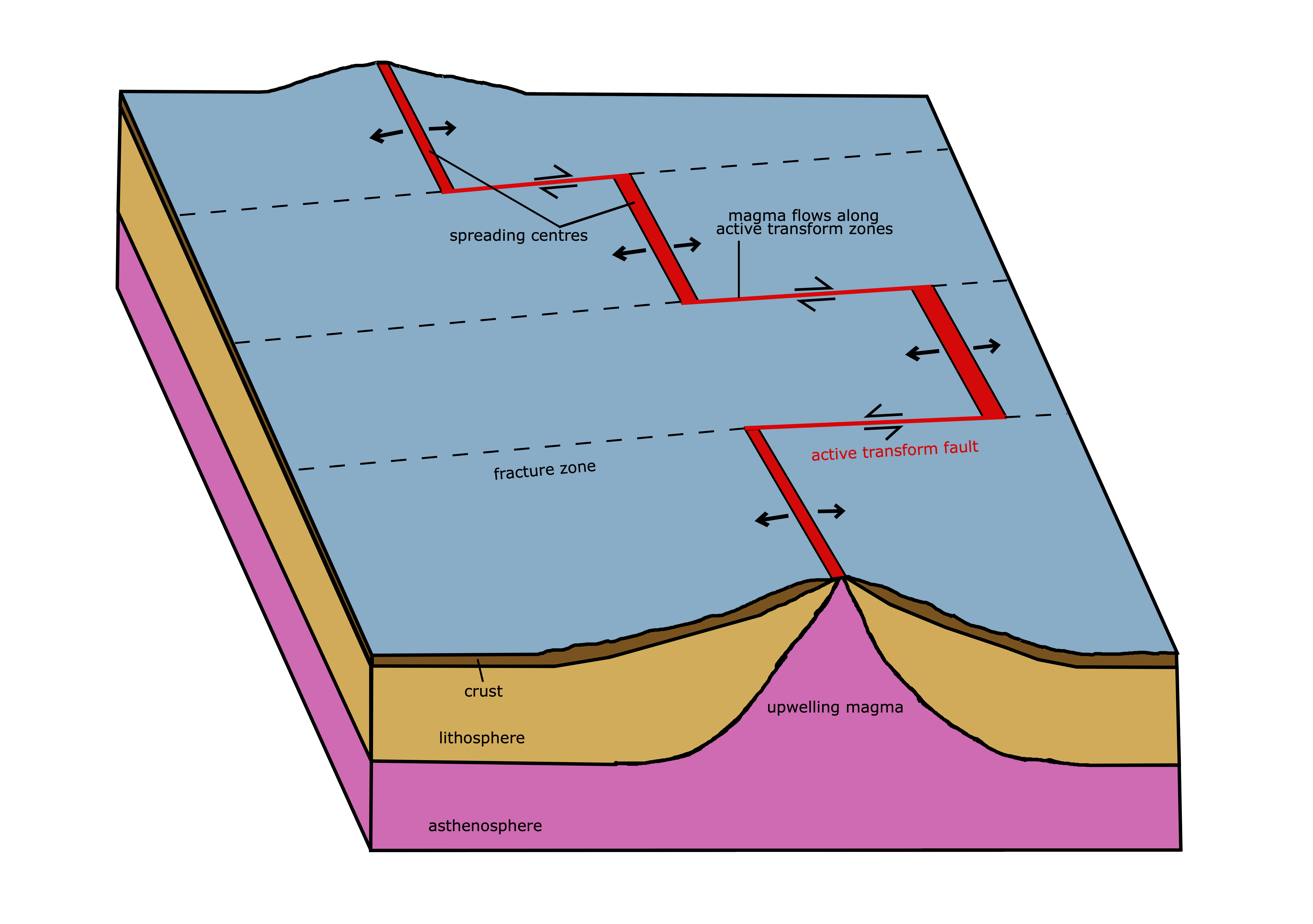
A schematic diagram of a mid-ocean ridge, showing how magma migrates as it ascends from the upwelling asthenosphere into the spreading centres and travelling along the active transforms.

A type of strike-slip fault called transform faults are abundant at mid-ocean ridge settings. These differ to normal strike slip faults as they occur only at plate boundaries, and are conservative boundaries: at these boundaries no crust is created or destroyed. Transform faults literally 'transform' to extensional rifting features, this way features are no terminated but interconnected globally. Oceanic lithospheric plates converge away from each other in an extensional setting, driven by Harry Hess's sea floor spreading model subduction slab-pull and ridge-push mechanism, however some areas of the ridge will spread at different rates due to differing factors, for example faster spreading rates are found to correspond with a lower Mg/Fe concentration. Transform faults begin to propagate perpendicular to the mid-ocean ridge, to accommodate the difference in spreading rates. Nucleation of the transforms always begins after spreading, and can occur at a range of spreading velocities from 12-20mm/yr to 145mm/yr. Displacement of the transform faults occurs centrally in a zone known as the principal transform displacement zone and slip along this displacement zone occurs via slower subseismic mechanisms rather than fast rupturing as seen in continental strike-slip faults. Across the mid ocean ridge, transform faults are areas of greater seismicity, however this does not correlate to magmatism.

Magmatism is abundant at the spreading centre, along the diverging plate boundary, due to decompression melting as the lithosphere thins. However, the formation of transform faults does not result in volcanic activity. Transform faults are thought to be a dam to magmatism flow, blocking the migration of partial melts away from mid oceanic ridge hot spots so they cannot reach adjacent spreading centres. This occurs because transform faults juxtapose the position of cooler, older plates with the warmer ridge, and so magma cannot reach a level of hydrostatic equilibrium as it cools quickly when exposed to the older plate. This mechanism effects the topography of the axial ridge, and generally at the intersection between the ridge and the transform, the topography is much deeper, becoming shallower towards the mid-way point between two transforms. Although magmatism induction and flow does not occur along transform faults, they are sites of hydrothermal systems (second-order phenomena of magmatism) which require active magma generation and high crustal permeability, both components that can be found at tectonically weakened, ridge-transform intersections. In this respect, at mid-ocean ridges, magmatism occurs as a result of sea-floor spreading, and influences the morphology and structure of the strike-slip transforms. Rather than strike-slip faulting having a causal relationship to magmatism, it is an effect of magmatism.

=== Oblique convergent margins ===
Oblique convergent margins are subduction zones where subduction occurs not completely orthogonal to the plate boundary, and instead the lithospheric slab subducts at an angle, commonly between 15°-30°. Strike-slip faults can occur as a result of strain partitioning, which is characteristic of oblique convergent margins, as the oblique plate motion can be split into stress components normal to the margin (thrust faulting) and parallel to the margin (strike-slip faults). Initially, a single strike-slip fault may form to accommodate strain partitioning, but as deformation continues, more strike-slip faults propagate and the strain is distributed among multiple strike-slip faults. Oblique convergent margins are therefore transpressive tectonic environments.

There a two types of magmatic arcs formed at oblique convergent margins:

- Intraoceanic Arcs – Subduction involves dense oceanic lithosphere subducting under less dense oceanic lithosphere. Characteristically forms a volcanic island arc that produces primitive magmas of a mafic composition, such as basalts, basaltic andesite and dacite.
- Continental Arcs – Dense oceanic crust subducts below less dense continental crust. Produces more evolved magmas of a felsic composition such as granitic melts.

Collisions and subduction between two continental plates – arc collision – produces collisional orogens and associated strike-slip fault systems, however these zones do not produce magmatic arcs as the crust and mountain ranges formed are too thick to accommodate magma flow. Crustal melting occurs due to the intense compressional pressure, and granitic melt intrusions can be found enriched in Sr–Nd–Hf isotope compositions, but do not reach the surface nor associate with the strike-slip faulting in this region.

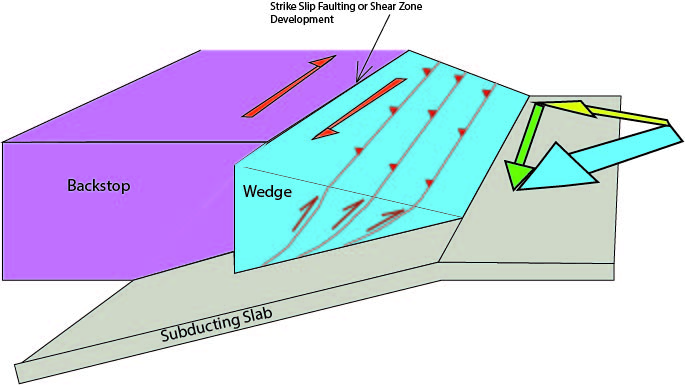
Figure showing how strain partitioning occurs at an oblique convergent margin to form a strike-slip faulting system parallel to the subduction zone and a normal faulting system orthogonal to the subduction zone.

At strain partitioned zones, there are observations of magmatism associated with strike-slip faulting. Oblique convergent margins always form a component magmatic arc along the obducted plate, parallel to the plate boundary. Strike-slip tectonism here is facilitated by the margin parallel magmatic arc; due to the high heat flow from magma transport in the arc, the whole area of lithosphere is part of a zone of weakness which can accommodate strike slip partitioning and initiate the formation of further strike-slip faults. Therefore, in a magmatic arc setting, strike-slip tectonism occurs readily, needing a relatively small component of tangential plate motion.

In areas of arc magmatism, exhumation is common as the transpressional environment exerts a huge amount of pressure on the magma. The magma, being less dense than the surrounding rock, already wants to migrate upwards. When combined with the pressure of the surrounding environment, magma becomes overpressurized, and needs room to ascend. The structure of strike-slip faults creates a vertical pressure gradient, which provides the most efficient path for the overpressurized magma to migrate from an area of high pressure to low pressure at the surface. Hence in oblique convergent settings, magmatism is associated with strike-slip faulting rather than thrust faulting. Strike-slip partitioning also has an effect in pluton and batholith emplacement at magmatic arcs: emplacement is driven by the vertical pressure gradient created at strike-slip faults. Magmas generated in intraoceanic arcs are derived from partial melting of mantle peridotite and oceanic crust, so are much more mafic in composition. Rarer magmas such as high-Mg andesite and boninite can be observed, as well as the more common basalts, andesites and dacites. At continental arcs, fractional crystallisation is the dominant process in magma generation, and the melts formed are more evolved due to magmatic differentiation through the felsic continental crust. Granitic plutons and granitic and rhyolitic melts are observed.

==== Magmatism and tectonism positive feedback ====
In oblique settings there is a positive feedback loop between tectonism and magmatism: the formation of strike-slip faults via strain partitioning connects the mid-crust to the mantle, enabling magmatic activity. Magmatic activity links directly to lithospheric thermal weakening, which develops into further strike-slip partitioning and fault propagation, which in turn allows for the migration of overpressurized magma (which has been overpressurized via tectonics overpressuring and transpressional kinematics). This continues to amplify the feedback loop as magmatic overpressurization leads to magmatic induced deformation.

== Examples ==
=== The Great Sumatran fault – Indonesia ===
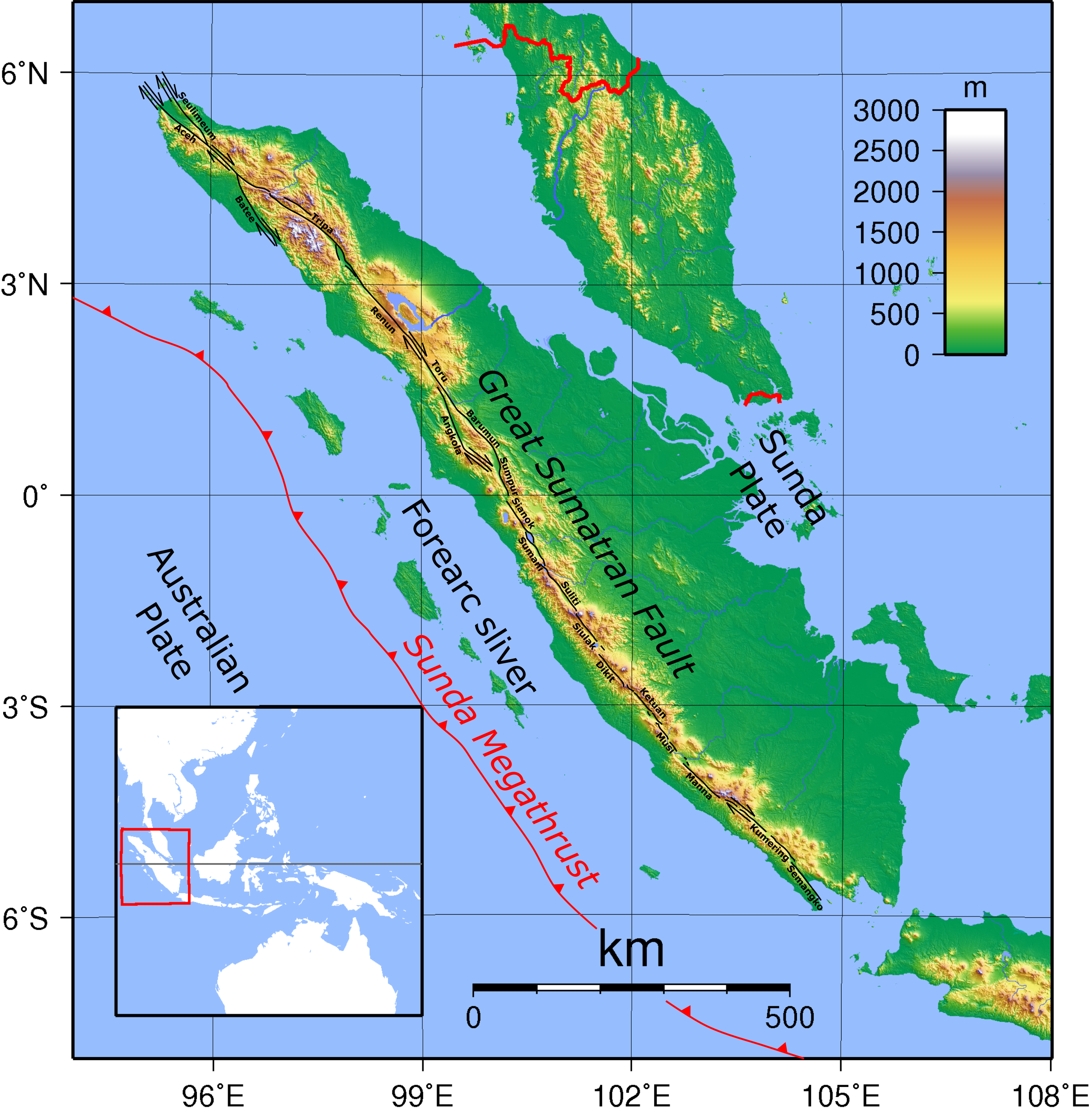
A map of the Great Sumatran fault system showing the location of the Sunda Megathrust Subduction Zone, magmatic arc and associated strike-slip faults.

The Great Sumatran fault (GSF) is an example of a system of intracontinental strike-slip faults, formed at an oblique convergent margin. Here the Indian-Australian Plate subducts below the Eurasian Plate. The fault system exhibits dextral motion and is NW-trending, with increasing curvature to the north, resulting in an increase in obliquity of the subduction zone northwards. Strain partitioning occurs resulting in components of slip normal and parallel to the plate margin, resulting in the creation of a zone of near-vertical faults exhibiting transcurrent motion. Strain partitioning increases with the curvature of the Sunda Trench, so the GSF and magmatic arc with which it coincides are also curved parallel to the trench. Due to increase in obliquity along the trench, the slip rate on the GSF also increases northwest.

==== Magmatism at the Great Sumatran fault ====
Strike-slip faulting occurs in the lithosphere opposite the Sunda subduction zone, and forms on the magmatic arc, where the lithosphere is already thermally weakened. Magmatism is seemingly focused at the GSF. Quaternary volcanic calderas – circular or elliptical volcanic depressions caused by subsidence after eruption – are present in releasing bends along the fault. The shape of the pull-apart basins formed at the releasing bends are analogous to the calderas, which are calc-alkaline in composition. Therefore, the strike-slip fault system has a direct effect on magmatism and magmatic and volcanic structures formed. Along the GSF, secondary features of magmatic activity such as hot springs and fumaroles are present, dominantly concentrated within the releasing bends/stepover zones along with primary magmatic and volcanic structures such as dykes, sills, vents and volcanoes. The geospatial positioning of these features confirms that magmatism is most active within the extensional zones of strike-slip faults, but still common in areas of pure strike-slip deformation.

=== The East Pacific Rise and San Andreas ===
The East Pacific Rise (EPR) is an example of a mid-ocean ridge, where the Pacific Plate and North American Plate diverge along a 2000 mile long spreading centre, from the Gulf of California in the north to the Southeastern Pacific Sea, almost to Antarctica. Oceanic transform faults at the EPR, such as the Garrett Transform and the Siqueiros Transform, are short and fast-spreading in comparison to oceanic transform faults at the Mid-Atlantic Ridge. As well as oceanic transforms, the EPR transform faults manifest on land near the Gulf of California as the San Andreas Fault. Here the motion of the Pacific and North American Plates is strike-slip, the Pacific Plate moves northwest at a much faster rate in comparison to the North American Plate. The San Andreas Fault is a dextral continental transform; it has a NW-SE trend, extending for 1300 km to a depth of up to 25 km.

==== Magmatism at the Garrett Transform fault ====
The Garrett Transform does not act as a barrier to magmatic flow like most oceanic transforms, and so magmatism and volcanic activity (of recent, zero age) is observed along the transform in the active tectonic domain. Dredging of the ocean floor and recovered ultramafic rock samples provide insights to magma composition and formation. Magma is thought to be depleted mid-ocean ridge basalts and porphyritic basalt magmas formed via partial-melting and melt extraction of the mantle and post-kinematic magmatic impregnation. There are two ideas for the origin of magmas in this fault zone; either decompression melting in response to transform pull-apart structures or due to small melt anomalies beneath the transform.

==== Magmatism at the Siqueiros transform fault system ====
The Siqueiros transform fault system is located on the northern end of EPR, situated south of Mexico in the Pacific Ocean. It is composed of five transform faults and four corresponding spreading centres. Magmatism at these transforms is induced via small melt anomalies in the mantle beneath the transforms. Melt escapes through the faults and so most eruption sites are located along the transform boundaries. This magmatism is thought to have led to the development of pull-apart basins which are now the intra-transform spreading centres of this system.

==== Magmatism at the San Andreas Fault ====
The San Andreas Fault is an active continental transform fault, and there is evidence for recent basaltic volcanism across this region. Majority of magmatism here occurs as a result of releasing fault bends along the transform which form pull-apart extensional basin structures: Coachella Valley, Imperial Valley, Owens Valley, Panamint Valley, and Death Valley to the north of the Mojave Desert. Thinning of the lithosphere in this way causes mantle upwelling and shallow decompression melting, thought to be the mechanism for magmatism at the San Andreas Fault. The transform acts as a magmatic conduit between the upper mantle and Earth's surface, and fault activity appears to be synchronous to volcanic events. As well as transtensional deformation, the San Andreas Fault also has areas of transpressional deformation seen in the Transverse Ranges. Crustal thickening and surface uplift features are present here but other than this there is little evidence for associated magmatism at these restraining bends - generally San Andreas Fault magmatism is associated with extension and reactivation of transform faults. Magma composition is mostly alkaline olivine basalt.

=== The Dead Sea transform fault ===
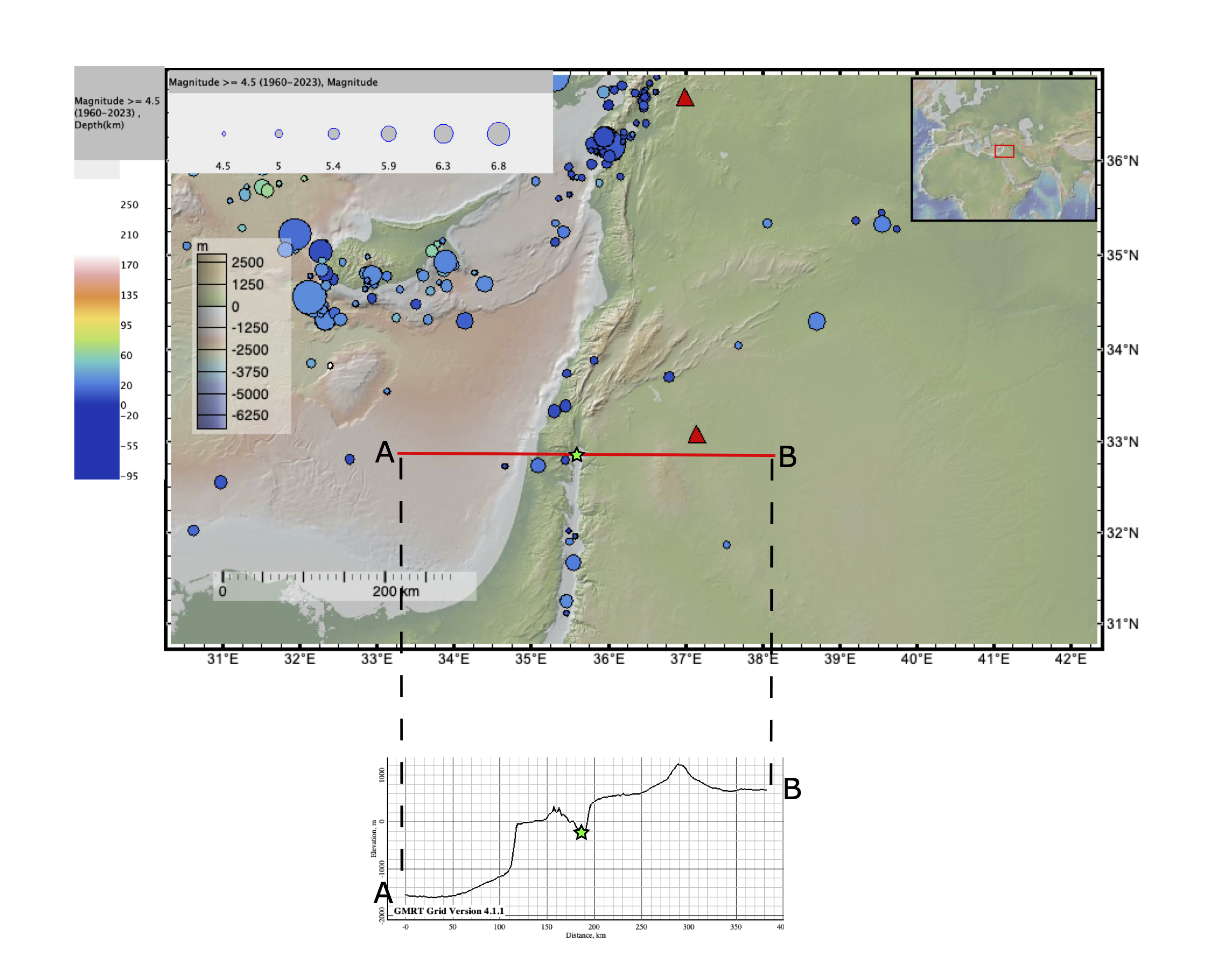
A map of the Dead Sea transform fault (DSTF) showing locations of volcanoes and earthquakes around the transform, as well as a cross section across the fault

The Dead Sea transform fault (DSTF) is another example of a well-known continental transform fault. This transform is roughly 1000 km in length, running from the Red Sea rifting system (south) up into Türkiye connecting to the East Anatolian Fault (north). It sits between the Arabian Plate to the east and the Sinai sub-plate to the west. This transform fault has a much slower slip rate than the San Andreas Fault, at just 5mm/yr in comparison to 30mm/yr.

==== Magmatism at the Dead Sea transform fault ====
The area has significant evidence for magmatism along the fault: positive geothermal anomalies, magnetic anomalies, and data from obtained from seismic tomography studies revealing the intrusion of igneous bodies, backed up by physical evidence from boreholes. Most magmatism related to the DSTF occurs in a transtensional stress regime – extension of the crust in this area has led to rifting which thins the crust. This results in subsidence that forms depressions in topography where the Sea of Galilee and the Dead Sea now sit. This unloading of weight across the fault due to rifting causes mantle upwelling, decompression melting and magma migration along the fault.

== Implications of magmatism along strike-slip faults ==
An understanding of magmatism along strike-slip faults is important as it is another process that contributes to global dynamics. By understanding the behaviour of these systems, predictions can be made about plate motions and geological evolutions. This is primarily important in terms of determining hazards to human health and risk to life. One of the risks associated with strike-slip faults are earthquakes, occurring when potential energy is built up by the force of rocks pushing passed each other and the strain is released as a significant seismic energy. Dependant on magnitude and location, earthquakes can be extremely deadly and fatal to nearby populations.

Where magma is in flux along strike-slip faults, it can trigger the early onset of earthquakes due to migration and movement along the fault. This makes it harder to predict earthquakes in areas associated with strike-slip magmatism, so monitoring and understanding of these areas is important for the mitigation of hazards. On the other hand, slips along the fault resulting earthquakes can trigger the eruption of associated volcanoes or slope instability along the volcano flanks. This poses a great risk to humans, especially in places like Sumatra with a population of 60 million, exposed to these hazards. This makes researching these systems vital in order to understand them and be able to forecast earth and or magma movements.
