= Oblique-slip fault =

Fault systems with combined strike-slip and dip-slip motion

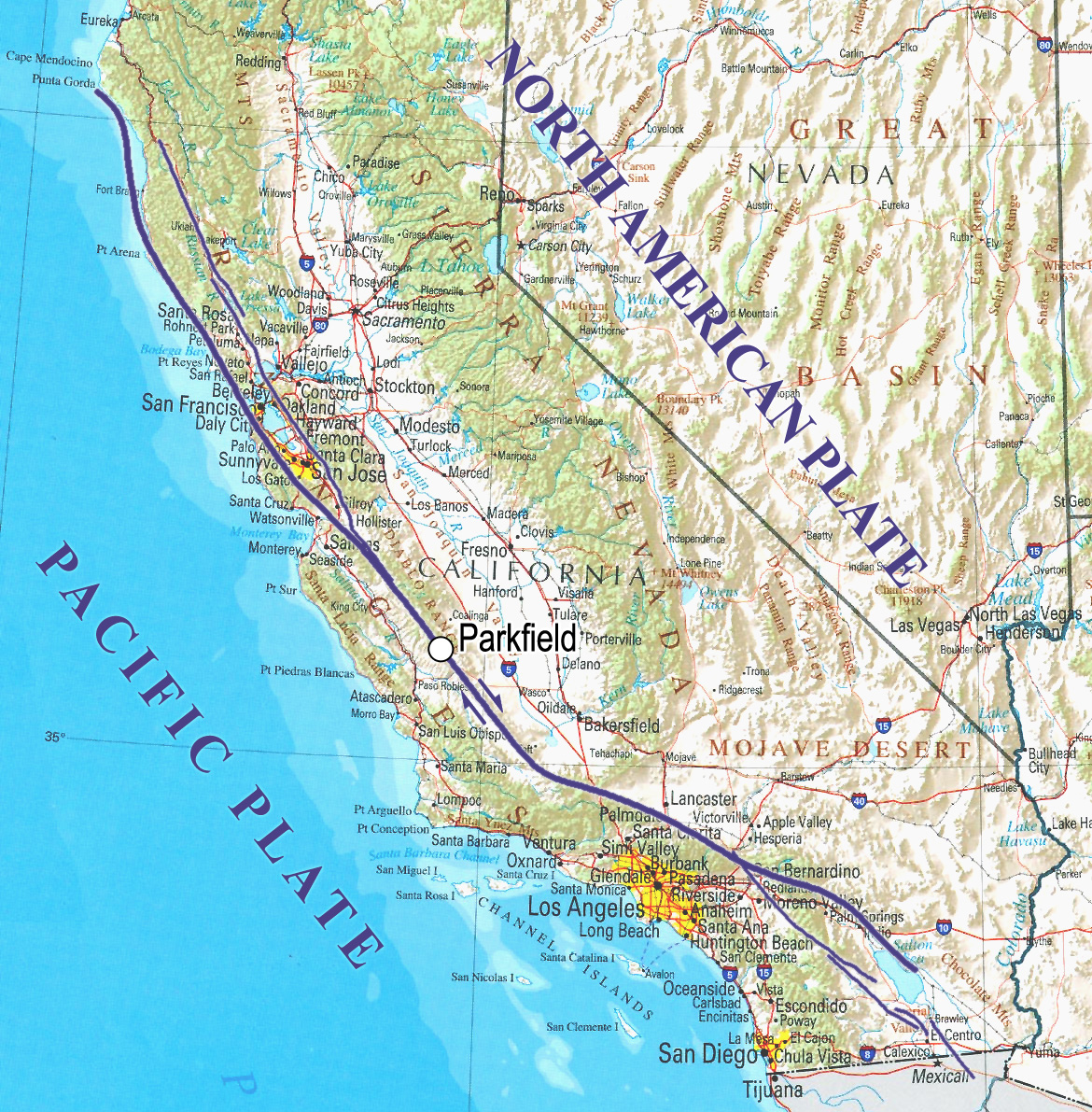
The San Andreas Fault wanders a bit. As do countless others.

In geology, an oblique-slip fault is a fault whose displacement has both strike-slip and dip-slip components, producing diagonal motion along the fault plane. Oblique-slip faults are classified by the relative proportions of strike‑ and dip‑slip movement. Most natural faults have at least some oblique component.

Oblique-slip faults may be normal or reverse in the dip‑slip sense, combined with a strike‑slip component. At mid-ocean ridges, oblique spreading can occur when transform faults deviate from the plate‑motion direction, forming obliquely spreading ridge segments and associated fracture zones.

== Characteristics ==
Oblique-slip faults are common at plate boundaries where the relative motion vector is neither purely parallel nor purely perpendicular to the fault trace. Field evidence from modern plate boundaries, such as the Fairweather Fault, shows oblique slip with both vertical offsets of terraces and significant strike‑slip motion.

Oblique rifting is another clear example: oblique divergence between tectonic plates localizes continental break‑up and strongly controls rift architecture and three‑dimensional basin geometry.

Oblique-slip kinematics are recognized by the intersection between a fault plane and geological surfaces (e.g., bedding, stratum, vein, or an unconformity), as well as by micro‑ to meso‑scale structures that preserve the direction, magnitude, and sense of movement along faults, shear zones, or other deformational structures.

=== Evolution of fault kinematics ===
Oblique-slip faults often preserve a progressive record of kinematic changes during deformation, reflecting shifts in the regional stress regime. For example, a fault may initiate as an oblique thrust (dominantly reverse motion with a minor strike‑slip component) and evolve into a strike‑slip fault as the tectonic environment changes, such as due to rotation of principal stresses or strain partitioning. This transition can be inferred from overprinting kinematic indicators (e.g., early thrust‑related fabrics cross‑cut or reoriented by later strike‑slip fabrics such as Riedel shears or slickensides) and from asymmetric fault‑zone structures (e.g., composite C‑S fabrics showing multiple shear‑sense orientations), and is common in transpressional or transtensional settings where faults accommodate oblique plate motions or localized rotations.

== Example ==
In the United States, the San Andreas Fault has segments with oblique characteristics, reflecting a motion vector that is not exactly parallel to the fault system.

== See also ==
- Fault
- Oblique subduction
- Thrust fault
