= Transcension =

Transcension may refer to:

- Transcension (novel), a 2002 science fiction novel by Damien Broderick
- Transcension, a 2012 album by the band Sleepers Awake
- "Transcension", a song by American jazz saxophonist Ernest Dawkins from the 2000 album Jo'burg Jump
- Transcension hypothesis, concerning aliens in space, related to the Fermi paradox

== See also ==
- Transtension
