= Maranatha (band) =

American sludge metal band

- Origin: Columbus, Ohio
- Genres: Stoner metal, sludge metal
- Years active: 2011–present
- Labels: New American
- Members: Collin Simula; Jack Huston; Wes Jackson; Darrell Chess
- Website: Maranatha on Facebook

Maranatha is sludge metal band from Ohio. The band consists of vocalist, guitarist, and drummer, Collin Simula, vocalist and bassist, Jack Huston, guitarist Darrell Chess and drummer Wes Jackson.

== History ==
Maranatha started in 2011 as a solo project of Collin Simula, former drummer and bassist for Symphony in Peril and drummer for Kingsblood. Simula independently released their debut EP, Incarnate, in 2012. In 2013, he independently released the second EP, Spiritless, that featured Nick Nowell of The Famine.

Simula added his longtime friend Jack Huston to play bass and do co-vocals. As of 2014, the band has two vocalists.

The band released their debut full-length album, Filth on July 24, 2015, via New American Records.

== Members ==
Current members

- Collin Simula – vocals, guitars (2011–present), drums (2011-2017) (formerly of Symphony In Peril and Kingsblood)
- Jack Huston – vocals, bass (2013–2014 [as Live], 2014–present) (White Wolves)
- Darrell Chess – guitars (2017–present) (Northern Widows)
- Wes Jackson – drums (2017–present) (Northern Widows)

Live

- Chris Thompson – guitar (2013–2017) (Sleepers Awake, White Wolves)
- Chris "Ambrose" Burnsides – drums (2013–2017) (Sleepers Awake, White Wolves)
- Danny – drums (2013)

== Discography ==
EPs

- Incarnate (2012)
- Spiritless (2013)

Splits

- Sanhedrin/Maranatha (2012)

Studio albums

- Filth (2015)
