= Sleepers Awake =

Sleepers Awake may refer to:

- "Sleepers Awake", English name for the hymn "Wachet auf, ruft uns die Stimme" (1599) by Philipp Nicolai
- "Sleepers awake", English name for the chorale cantata Wachet auf, ruft uns die Stimme, BWV 140 (1731), by Johann Sebastian Bach, based on Nicolai's hymn
- The Sleeper Awakes (1910), dystopian novel by H. G. Wells about a man who sleeps for two hundred and three years
- Sleepers Awake (1946), poetry collection by Kenneth Patchen
- Sleepers, Wake! Technology and the Future of Work (1982), book by Barry Jones
- Sleepers Awake (band), rock band from Columbus, Ohio, formed in 2005
- Sleepers Awake, a 2026 opera by Gregory Spears
