= Lost Memoirs and Faded Pictures =

Studio album by Symphony in Peril
- Released: November 4, 2003
- Genre: Metalcore
- Length: 47:10
- Label: Facedown
- Producer: Doug White

Symphony in Peril chronology
2 Track demo (2002)	Lost Memoirs and Faded Pictures (2003)	The Whore's Trophy (2005)

Lost Memoirs and Faded Pictures is the debut studio album by metalcore band Symphony in Peril. It was released on November 4, 2003.

== Track listing ==
1. "Shadow Over a Bleeding Heart" - 3:41
2. "Letting Go Would Be An End" - 4:03
3. "The Quotidian Succession" - 3:47
4. "Sifting Through These Ashes" - 5:03
5. "Beauty Forgotten" - 1:13
6. "Lament" - 3:06
7. "Unsteady Docks Along the Ohio" - 3:12
8. "Portrait" - 3:23
9. "Three Months" - 1:20
10. "Can One Possess Autumn?" - 18:22

== Personnel ==
- Shawn Jonas - vocals
- Andy Reale - guitar
- Joshua Aronovsky - guitar
- Collin Simula - bass
- Shawn Seippel - drums

Production

- Doug White - producer, engineering, mixing, mastering
- Caleb Olsen - layout, design
