= Indenter tectonics =

Geological interaction

Indenter tectonics, also known as escape tectonics, is a branch of strike-slip tectonics that involves the collision and deformation of two continental plates. It can be observed in many situations around the world, and is associated with high-grade metamorphism and extensive lateral displacement of strata along oblique strike-slip faults

== Model ==
The concept of indenter tectonics was first introduced by Molnar and Tapponnier in 1975, with reference to the Himalayan orogeny. Various experiments have illustrated the process by which deformation occurs.

A continent-continent collision can be visualized as a 'die-and-metal' model, with a rigid die (the 'indenter') moving into a softer, rigid-plastic metal (the 'host'). In a tectonic setting, the terms 'rigid' and 'soft' refer to the strength of the lithosphere. The strong lithosphere of the indenter remains relatively undeformed and its boundaries are preserved, while the host allows deformation by lateral movement of crust both along the contact with the indenter and within the host. The indenter block is too buoyant to subduct, so crustal accommodation is achieved by either shallow underthrusting and crustal thickening, or formation and later lateral displacement of several microplates. It is possible to have a combination of the two models.

== Examples ==
Real-world examples differ by the rigidity of the indenter, the size and rheology of both the host and the indenter, and the extent of lateral confinement. The best known active example is the system of strike-slip structures observed in the Eurasian Plate as it responds to collision with the Indian Plate, but similar events can be found all over the Earth.

=== Asia ===
- Indian and Eurasian plates (Himalayan orogeny)
- Palawan microcontinental block and Philippine Mobile Belt

=== North America ===
- Slave craton and Churchill province
- Ouachita Terrane

=== Europe ===
- African Plate and Eurasian Plate (Alpine orogeny)
