= Symphony in Peril =

American Christian metalcore band

- Origin: Columbus, Ohio, US
- Genres: Metalcore, Christian metal, thrash metal
- Years active: 2002–2005, 2022–present
- Label: Facedown
- Members: Shawn Jonas; Andy Capps; Josh King; Dan Pelletier; Bryan Yost
- Past members: Andy Reale; Joshua Aronovsky; Collin Simula; John Pope; Joshua Hunt; Jeremy Hunt; Tim Stephson; Shawn Seippel

Symphony in Peril is a Christian metalcore band from Columbus, Ohio, United States. The band started in early 2002, and broke up in 2006, after Hellfest, which the band was to play, but was cancelled at the last minute. As of 2022, they are active again with several new members.

== History ==
Symphony in Peril formed in Columbus, OH in early 2002. The band gained attention quite early in their development because Shawn Jonas, former vocalist for popular metalcore band Zao, was one of the founding members.

Quickly, they signed with Facedown Records, and released their debut full-length, Lost Memoirs and Faded Pictures, in 2003. The band toured nationally and internationally with bands such as Nodes of Ranvier and the Chariot and also performed at the Cornerstone and Sonshine festivals.

In March 2005, shortly after releasing their second album, The Whore's Trophy, the band announced that vocalist Shawn Jonas had left the band. In June of the same year, the band announced that John Pope, former singer for fellow Ohio band Narcissus, would be replacing Jonas.

Later that year, in October, the band announced via their MySpace blog that the band would break up after a few final performances in November.

In more recent years, Drummer/Bassist Collin Simula formed a new project titled Maranatha, which was the first band of any of the members from SIP.

In October 2022 the band was active again with a lineup including Shawn and Andy Capps and released a new single. On February 22, 2023, it was announced the band will play their first show in 18 years at the 2023 Furnace Fest preshow.

== Members ==
Current Members

- Shawn Jonas - vocals (2002–2006, 2022-present)
- Andy Capps - bass (2004–2006) guitar (2022-present)
- Dan Pelletier - guitar (2022-present)
- Josh King - drums (2022-present)
- Bryan Yost - bass (2023-present)

Former

- Collin Simula - drums (2004–2006), bass (2002–2004)
- John Pope - vocals (2005)
- Joshua Hunt - drums (2002)
- Jeremy Hunt - guitar (2002)
- Tim Stephson - bass (2002)
- Shawn Seippel - drums (2002–2004)
- Andy Reale - guitar (2002–2006)
- Joshua Aronovsky - guitar (2002–2006), bass (2002)
- Chico Weeks - bass (2022-2023)

== Discography ==
EPs

- 2-track demo - 2002

Studio albums

- Lost Memoirs and Faded Pictures - Facedown, 2003
- The Whore's Trophy - Facedown, 2005
