= Magmatism =

Surface magma that becomes igneous rock

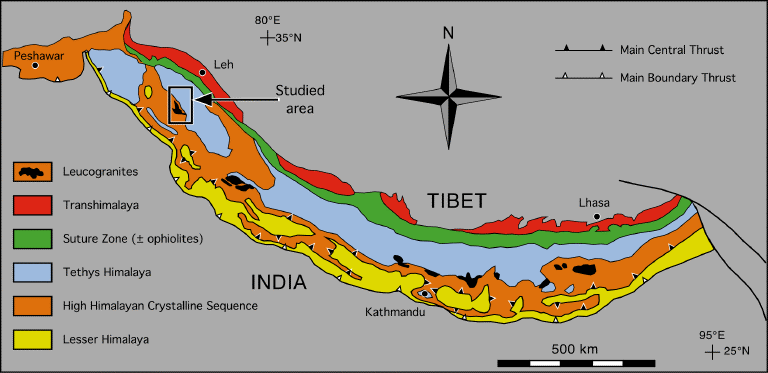
Geological map showing the Gangdese batholith, which is a product of magmatic activity about 100 million years ago.

Magmatism is the emplacement of magma within and at the surface of the outer layers of a terrestrial planet, which solidifies as igneous rocks. It does so through magmatic activity or igneous activity, the production, intrusion and extrusion of magma or lava. Volcanism is the surface expression of magmatism.

Magmatism is one of the main processes responsible for mountain formation. The nature of magmatism depends on the tectonic setting. For example, andesitic magmatism is associated with the formation of island arcs at convergent plate boundaries while basaltic magmatism is found at mid-ocean ridges during sea-floor spreading at divergent plate boundaries.

On Earth, magma forms by partial melting of silicate rocks either in the mantle, continental or oceanic crust. Evidence for magmatic activity is usually found in the form of igneous rocks formed from magma.

== Convergent boundaries ==
Magmatism is associated with all stages of the development of convergent plate boundaries, from the initiation of subduction through to continental collision and its immediate aftermath.

=== Subduction-related ===
The subduction of oceanic crust, whether beneath oceanic or continental crust, is associated in almost all cases with partial melting of the overlying asthenosphere due to the addition of volatiles (especially water) expelled from the downgoing slab. Only when the slab fails to reach sufficient depth as in the earliest stages of subduction or where there are periods of flat-slab subduction that completely pinch out the asthenosphere, is magmatism absent. The magmatism is mostly calc-alkaline in type along a well-defined curvilinear magmatic arc. Only the volcanic parts of modern arcs are exposed at the surface and the understanding of the underlying magma chambers relies on geophysical methods. Ancient arc sequences that formed on continental crust or that have become accreted to continental crust are often deeply eroded and the plutonic equivalents of the arc volcanoes become exposed.

=== Collision-related ===
Continental collisions are accompanied by major crustal thickening, leading to heating and anatexis within the crust, generally in the form of peraluminous granitic intrusions.

=== Post-collision ===
Post-collisional magmatism is a result of decompression melting associated with isostatic rebound and possible extensional collapse of the thickened crust formed during the collision. Slab detachment has also been proposed as a cause of late to post-collisional magmatism.

== Divergent boundaries ==
The new crust that is formed at divergent boundaries within oceanic crust is almost entirely magmatic in origin.

=== Mid-ocean ridges ===
Mid-ocean ridge spreading centres are the sites of almost continuous magmatism. The basalts erupted at mid-ocean ridges are tholeiitic in character and result from the partial melting of upwelling asthenosphere. The composition of Mid-Ocean Ridge Basalts (MORB) shows little variation globally as they come from a mostly homogeneous source.

=== Back-arc basins ===
Back-arc extension often leads to the formation of oceanic crust and relatively short-lived spreading centres. As the asthenosphere behind the arc has been partly affected by volatiles from the downgoing slab, the typical back-arc basin basalts are intermediate in character between MORB type basalts and Island Arc Basalts (IAB) type basalts.

== Intraplate ==
Magmatic activity away from plate boundaries forms an important part of the magmatism on earth, including the largest magmatic events known, Large Igneous Provinces.

=== Hotspots ===
Hotspots are sites of upwelling of relatively hot mantle, possibly associated with mantle plumes, that cause partial melting of the asthenosphere. This type of magmatism forms volcanic seamounts or oceanic islands when they become emergent. Over short geological timescales the hotspots appear to be fixed relative to one another, forming a reference frame against which plate motions can be measured. As tectonic plates move relative to a hotspot, the location of magmatic activity on the plate shifts, causing the development of time-progressive chains of volcanoes such as the Hawaiian–Emperor seamount chain. The main product of hotspot volcanoes are Ocean Island Basalts (OIB), which are distinct from MORB and IAB type basalts.

Where hotspots are developed beneath the continents the products are different, as the mantle-derived magmas cause melting of the continental crust, forming granitic magmas that reach the surface as rhyolites. The Yellowstone hotspot is an example of continental hotspot magmatism, which also displays time-progressive shifts in magmatic activity.

=== Rifts ===
Many continental rift zones are associated with magmatism due to upwelling of the asthenosphere as the lithosphere is thinned, which leads to decompression melting. The magmatism is often bimodal in character as the mantle-derived basaltic magmas cause partial melting of the continental crust.

=== Large igneous provinces ===
Large igneous provinces (LIPs) are defined as "mainly mafic (+ ultramafic) magmatic provinces with an areal extent >0.1 Mkm^{2} and igneous volume >0.1Mkm^{3}, that have intraplate characteristics, and are emplaced in a short duration pulse or multiple pulses (less than 1–5 Ma) with a maximum duration of <c.50 Ma".

== Intruded v. extruded magma ==
The relative volumes of extruded versus intruded magmas has been estimated for the various tectonic settings during the Cenozoic. Overall the global total for volcanism is in the range 3.7–4.1 km^{3}, compared to 22.1–29.5 km^{3} for intrusions.

== See also ==
- Magmatism along strike-slip faults
