= The Whore's Trophy =

Studio album by Symphony in Peril
- Released: February 15, 2005
- Genre: Metalcore, Christian metal, thrash metal
- Length: 37:53
- Label: Facedown Records

Symphony in Peril chronology
Lost Memoirs and Faded Pictures (2003)	The Whore's Trophy (2005)

The Whore's Trophy is Symphony in Peril's second and final full-length album, and was released on February 15, 2005. The basis of the album is the Bible's Book of Revelation, specifically chapter 17.

== Track listing ==
1. "Perelandra" - 0:35
2. "For Now We See in a Mirror, Dimly, But Then Face to Face" - 4:13
3. "Stiletto" - 2:13
4. "Seduction by Design" - 3:08
5. "...And She Was Drunk With the Blood of the Saints" - 4:25
6. "Revolving Door Romance" - 3:35
7. "The Whore's Trophy I" - 3:14
8. "The Whore's Trophy II" - 3:58
9. "Waiting to Breathe" - 4:12
10. "This Flame Breeds Disbelief" - 1:26
11. "Inherent Scars" - 4:05
12. "Aborting the Fabricated" - 2:56
