= Horse (geology) =

Block of rock completely surrounded by mineral veins or fault planes

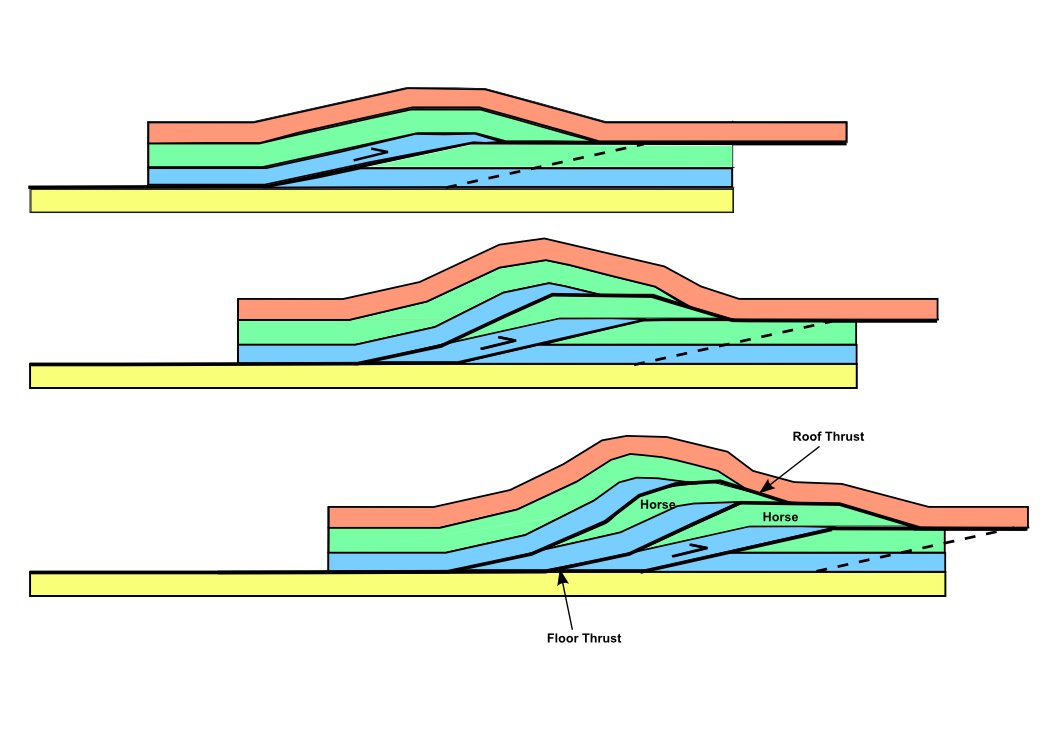
Diagram showing development of thrust-bounded horses within a thrust duplex

A horse sits between the walls of this normal fault located near Upheaval Dome, Utah. The fault plane traces from the upper right to the lower left of the image. The horse is the broad lens-shaped feature in the rock defined by the splitting and rejoining of the trace of the fault plane.

A horse, in geology, is any block of rock completely separated from the surrounding rock either by mineral veins or fault planes. In mining, a horse is a block of country rock entirely encased within a mineral lode. In structural geology the term was first used to describe the thrust-bounded imbricates found within a thrust duplex. In later literature, the term became a general name for any block completely bounded by faults, whether the deformation is contractional, extensional or strike-slip in nature. Examples of horses have been described in both extensional duplexes and strike-slip duplexes.
