= Filth (Maranatha album) =

Studio album by Maranatha
- Released: July 24, 2015
- Recorded: 2014–2015
- Genres: Sludge metal; hardcore punk; Sludgecore
- Length: 33:59
- Label: New American
- Producer: Maranatha

Maranatha chronology
Spiritless (2013)	Filth (2015)

Professional ratings
Review scores
Source	Rating
Heavy Blog Is Heavy	4/5 stars
Ohio Noise	9/10 stars

Filth is the debut album of the sludge metal band, Maranatha. The album was released on July 24, 2015, via New American Records.

== Critical reception ==
"Between the earth-shaking riffs, canyon-wide grooves and the brutally honest lyrical content, Filth makes for an extremely heavy listen. The contrasting personal beliefs of [Collin] Simula and [Jack] Huston give Maranatha a unique and unfiltered perspective regarding spirituality, and as the record's name indicates, Filth is really all about the filthy side of this world we live in. It's a vitriolic call to arms, a rage-filled rally to fix this broken world, and an honest representation of our own broken humanity." writes Aaron Lambert. Jeremiah Nelson reports "Filth is as heavy as they come. Monstrous riffs combine with angry hardcore and intimate, bloody lyrics. The band that started as a one-man emotional outlet is growing into a fearsome beast. Maranatha is releasing Filth on New American Records on July 24. You can pre-order it here." Shayne Mathis of FullMetalHipster writes "Straight outta my home state of Ohio comes Maranatha. The band's new album, Filth, hits like a ton of bricks. Bricks made of rage. It's the musical equivalent of the Incredible Hulk during the World War Hulk storyline. Bottomless, unstoppable fury." "With all that said, I think the most important part of the Maranatha is not so much their sound, but the lyrical tension between the injustice of this world and finding peace with in it. It's a constant push and pull against black and white, depravity and morality, and the hypocrisy of those who claim to know the way and preach a message of love out of one side of their mouths and a doctrine of ignorance and sometimes pure hate out of the other. It's a theme carried on from the very first releases and expounded upon and explored in further depth on Filth. My advice to the listener is to listen to what's being said as well as letting the music pummel you.

For Maranatha's first full length, Filth. I’d have to rate this a solid "9". A "9" you say? Yes, because it wasn't enough. I want more."

== Track listing ==
No.	Title	Length
1.	"Despair"	2:34
2.	"Heroes"	3:43
3.	"Patriarch"	1:53
4.	"Violet"	0:51
5.	"Numb"	4:04
6.	"Depressive / Oppressive"	4:31
7.	"Black Eyes"	2:34
8.	"Stigmata"	1:56
9.	"Cancer"	5:06
10.	"Misotheist"	6:46
Total length:		33:59

== Personnel ==
Maranatha

- Collin Simula – vocals, guitar, drums
- Jack Huston – vocals, bass

Production

- Bobby Leonard – engineer, mixing
- Brad Boatright – mastering
