= Strike-slip tectonics =

Deformation dominated by horizontal movement in Earth's lithosphere

Strike-slip tectonics or wrench tectonics is a type of tectonics that is dominated by lateral (horizontal) movements within the Earth's crust (and lithosphere). Where a zone of strike-slip tectonics forms the boundary between two tectonic plates, this is known as a transform or conservative plate boundary. Areas of strike-slip tectonics are characterised by particular deformation styles including: stepovers, Riedel shears, flower structures and strike-slip duplexes. Where the displacement along a zone of strike-slip deviates from parallelism with the zone itself, the style becomes either transpressional or transtensional depending on the sense of deviation. Strike-slip tectonics is characteristic of several geological environments, including oceanic and continental transform faults, zones of oblique collision and the deforming foreland of zones of continental collision.

== Deformation styles ==
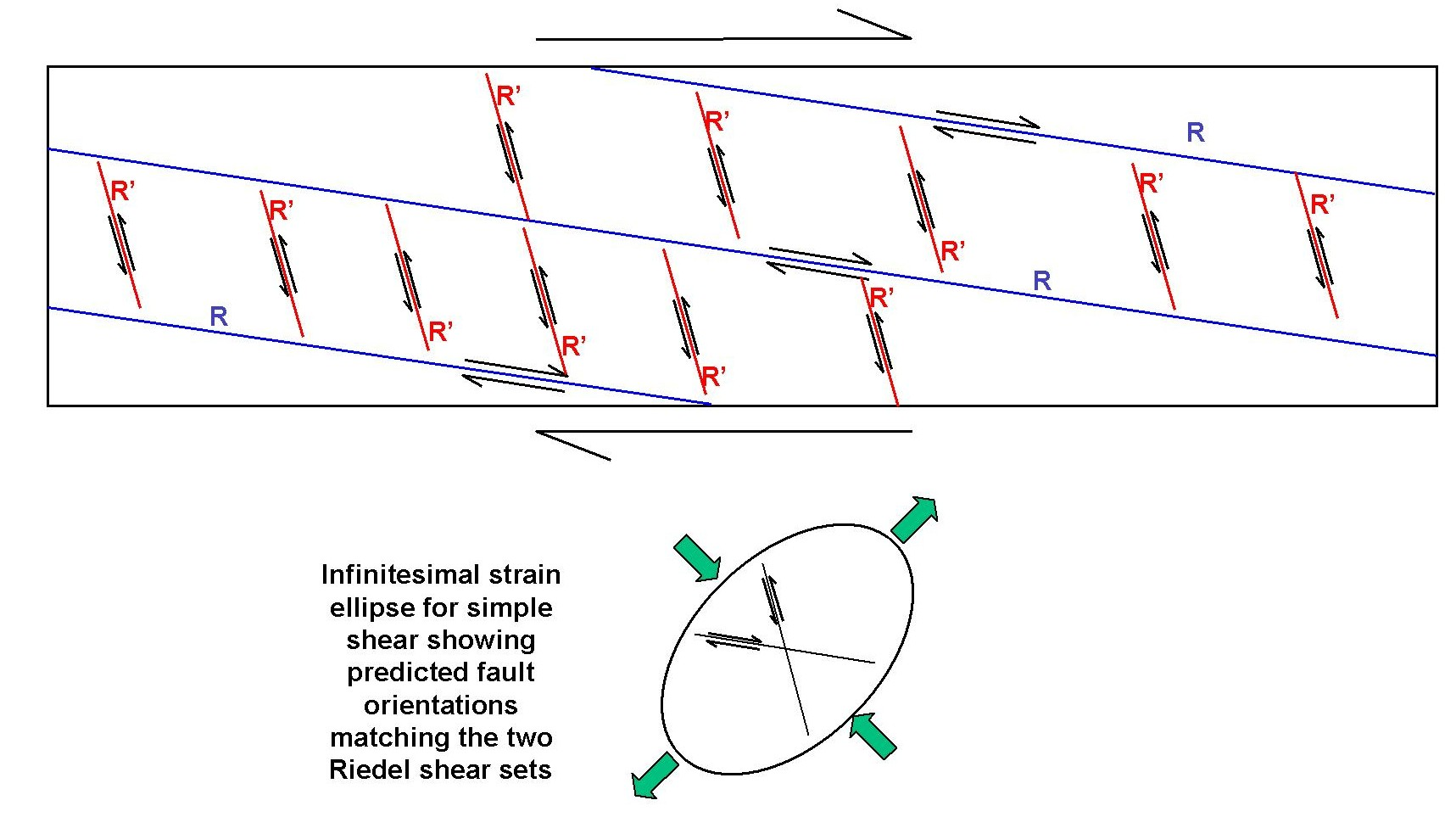
Development of Riedel shears in a zone of dextral shear

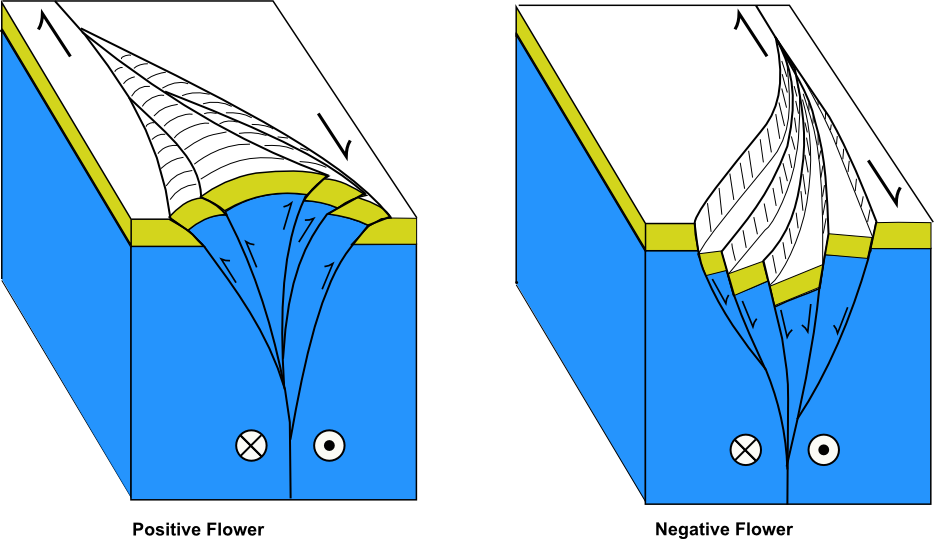
Flower structures developed along minor restraining and releasing bends on a dextral (right-lateral) strike-slip fault

=== Stepovers ===
When strike-slip fault zones develop, they typically form as several separate fault segments that are offset from each other. The areas between the ends of adjacent segments are known as stepovers. In the case of a dextral fault zone, a right-stepping offset is known as an extensional stepover as movement on the two segments leads to extensional deformation in the zone of offset, while a left-stepping offset is known as a compressional stepover. For active strike-slip systems, earthquake ruptures may jump from one segment to another across the intervening stepover, if the offset is not too great. Numerical modelling has suggested that jumps of at least 8 km, or possibly more are feasible. This is backed up by evidence that the rupture of the 2001 Kunlun earthquake jumped more than 10 km across an extensional stepover. The presence of stepovers during the rupture of strike-slip fault zones has been associated with the initiation of supershear propagation (propagation in excess of the S wave velocity) during earthquake rupture.

=== Riedel shear structures ===
In the early stages of strike-slip fault formation, displacement within basement rocks produces characteristic fault structures within the overlying cover. This will also be the case where an active strike-slip zone lies within an area of continuing sedimentation. At low levels of strain, the overall simple shear causes a set of small faults to form. The dominant set, known as R shears, forms at about 15° to the underlying fault with the same shear sense. The R shears are then linked by a second set, the R' shears, that forms at about 75° to the main fault trace. These two fault orientations can be understood as conjugate fault sets at 30° to the short axis of the instantaneous strain ellipse associated with the simple shear strain field caused by the displacements applied at the base of the cover sequence. With further displacement, the Riedel fault segments will tend to become fully linked until a throughgoing fault is formed. The linkage often occurs with the development of a further set of shears known as 'P shears', which are roughly symmetrical to the R shears relative to the overall shear direction. The somewhat oblique segments will link downwards into the fault at the base of the cover sequence with a helicoidal geometry.

=== Flower structures ===
In detail, many strike-slip faults at surface consist of en echelon or braided segments, which in many cases were probably inherited from previously formed Riedel shears. In cross-section, the displacements are dominantly reverse or normal in type depending on whether the overall fault geometry is transpressional (i.e. with a small component of shortening) or transtensional (with a small component of extension). As the faults tend to join downwards onto a single strand in basement, the geometry has led to these being termed flower structure. Fault zones with dominantly reverse faulting are known as positive flowers, while those with dominantly normal offsets are known as negative flowers. The identification of such structures, particularly where positive and negative flowers are developed on different segments of the same fault, are regarded as reliable indicators of strike-slip.

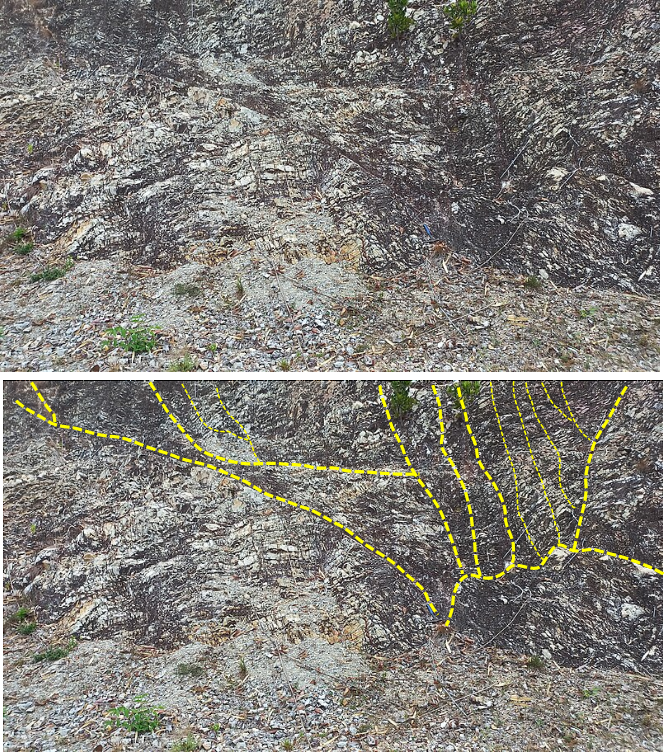
An exposure of highly deformed bedded chert in Busuanga, Philippines, containing a flower structure (yellow dashed lines)

=== Strike-slip duplexes ===
Strike-slip duplexes occur at the stepover regions of faults, forming lens-shaped near parallel arrays of horses. These occur between two or more large bounding faults which usually have large displacements.

An idealized strike-slip fault runs in a straight line with a vertical dip and has only horizontal motion, thus there is no change in topography due to motion of the fault. In reality, as strike-slip faults become large and developed, their behavior changes and becomes more complex. A long strike-slip fault follows a staircase-like trajectory consisting of interspaced fault planes that follow the main fault direction. These sub-parallel stretches are isolated by offsets at first, but over long periods of time, they can become connected by stepovers to accommodate the strike-slip displacement. In long stretches of strike-slip, the fault plane can start to curve, giving rise to structures similar to step overs.

Right lateral motion of a strike-slip fault at a right stepover (or overstep) gives rise to extensional bends characterised by zones of subsidence, local normal faults, and pull-apart basins. On extensional duplexes, normal faults will accommodate the vertical motion, creating negative relief. Similarly, left stepping at a dextral fault generates contractional bends; this shortens the stepovers which are displayed by local reverse faults, push-up zones, and folds. On contractional duplex structures, thrust faults will accommodate vertical displacement rather than being folded, as the uplifting process is more energy-efficient.

Strike-slip duplexes are passive structures; they form as a response to displacement of the bounding fault rather than by the stresses from plate motion. Each horse has a length that varies from half to twice the spacing between the bounding fault planes. Depending on the properties of the rocks and the fault, the duplexes will have different length ratios and will develop on either major or subtle offsets, although it is possible to observe duplex structures that develop on nearly straight fault segments. Because the motion of the duplexes may be heterogeneous, the individual horses can experience a rotation with a horizontal axis, which results in the formation of scissor faults. Scissor faults exhibit normal motion at one end of the horse and a thrust motion at the other end. Because strike-slip duplex structures have more horizontal motion than vertical motion, they are best observed on a map rather than a vertical projection and are a good indication that the main fault has a strike-slip motion.

An example of strike-slip duplexes is observed in the Lambertville sill, New Jersey. Flemington and the Hopewell faults, the two main faults in the region, experienced 3 km of dip-slip and over 20 km of strike-slip motions to accommodate regional extension. It is possible to trace the lensoidal structures which are interpreted as horses that form duplexes. The lens structures observed in the 3M quarry are 180 meters long and 10 meters wide. The main duplex is 30 m in length and other smaller duplexes are also present.

== Geological environments associated with strike-slip tectonics ==
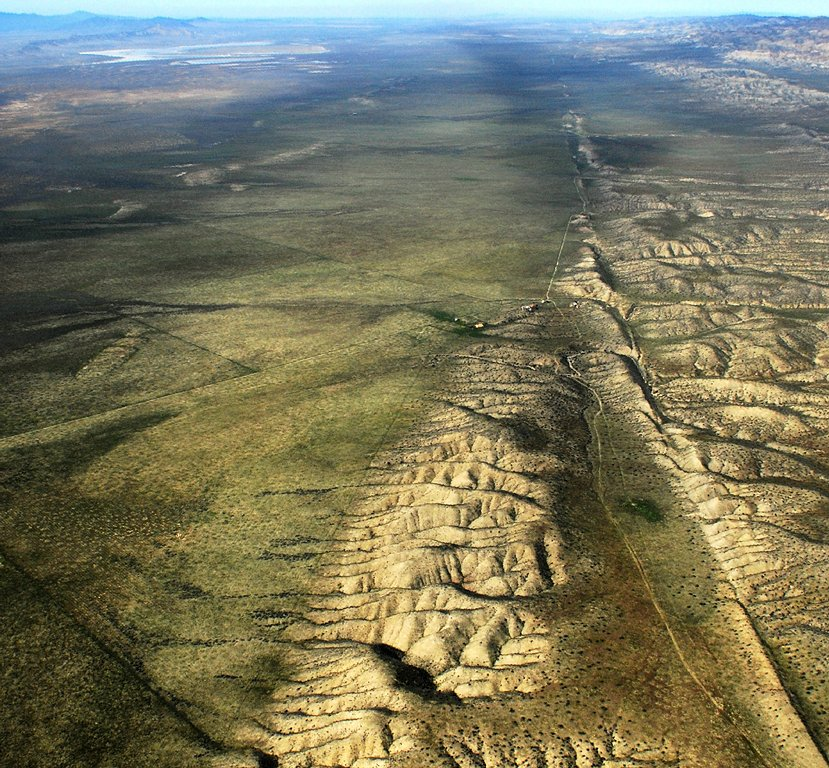
San Andreas Transform Fault on the Carrizo Plain

Areas of strike-slip tectonics are associated with:

=== Oceanic transform boundaries ===
Mid-ocean ridges are broken into segments offset from each other by transform faults. The active part of the transform links the two ridge segments. Some of these transforms can be very large, such as the Romanche fracture zone, whose active portion extends for about 300 km.

=== Continental transform boundaries ===
Transform faults within continental plates include some of the best-known examples of strike-slip structures, such as the San Andreas Fault, the Dead Sea Transform, the North Anatolian Fault and the Alpine Fault.

=== Lateral ramps in areas of extensional or contractional tectonics ===
Major lateral offsets between large extensional or thrust faults are normally connected by diffuse or discrete zones of strike-slip deformation allowing the transfer of the overall displacement between the structures.

=== Zones of oblique collision ===
In most zones of continent-continent collision, the relative movement of the plates is oblique to the plate boundary itself. The deformation along the boundary is normally partitioned into dip-slip contractional structures in the foreland with a single large strike-slip structure in the hinterland accommodating all the strike-slip component along the boundary. Examples include the Main Recent Fault along the boundary between the Arabian plate and Eurasian plate behind the Zagros fold and thrust belt, the Liquiñe-Ofqui Fault that runs through Chile and the Great Sumatran fault that runs parallel to the subduction zone along the Sunda Trench.

=== The deforming foreland of a zone of continent-continent collision ===
The process sometimes known as indenter tectonics, first elucidated by Paul Tapponnier, occurs during a collisional event where one of the plates deforms internally along a system of strike-slip faults. The best known active example is the system of strike-slip structures observed in the Eurasian plate as it responds to collision with the Indian plate, such as the Kunlun fault and Altyn Tagh fault.

== See also ==
- Magmatism along strike-slip faults
