= Transpression =

Type of strike-slip deformation

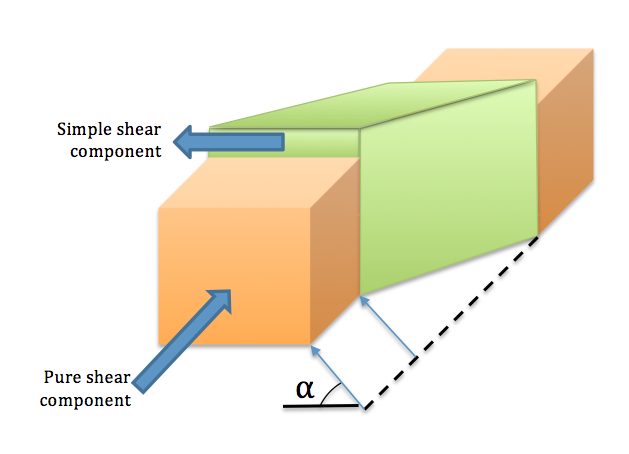
Simple model for transpression: strike-slip zone with an additional and simultaneous shortening across the zone. Also induces vertical uplift.

In geology, transpression is a type of strike-slip deformation that deviates from simple shear because of a simultaneous component of shortening perpendicular to the fault plane. This movement ends up resulting in oblique shear. It is generally very unlikely that a deforming body will experience "pure" shortening or "pure" strike-slip. The relative amounts of shortening and strike-slip can be expressed in the convergence angle alpha which ranges from zero (ideal strike-slip) to 90 degrees (ideal convergence). During shortening, unless material is lost, transpression produces vertical thickening in the crust. Transpression that occurs on a regional scale along plate boundaries is characterized by oblique convergence. More locally, transpression occurs within restraining bends in strike-slip fault zones.

== Transpressional structures ==
Transpressional shear zones are characterized by an association of structures that suggest zone-normal shortening and zone-parallel shearing. Commonly developed features include transposition foliations, lineations, stylolites, folds, and reverse faults. Pure shear-dominated transpression usually gives steep lineations, while simple shear-dominated transpression favors horizontal lineations. It is also common for non-vertical transpressional zones to have a significant component of shearing parallel to the dipline of the zone boundary. In these zones, the lineations are between horizontal and vertical. The complete geometry presented by all structural elements in the zone is used to constrain the actual boundary displacements.

== Restraining bend ==
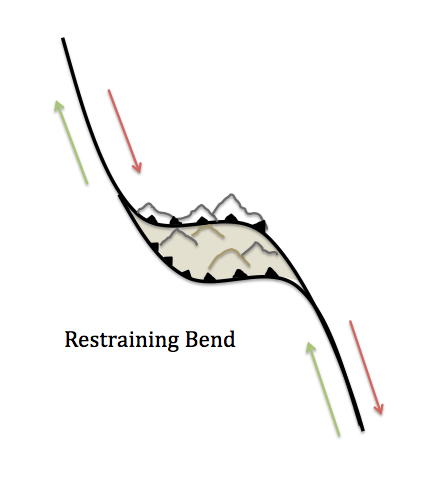
A contractional duplex that has developed at the bend/stepover along a strike-slip fault.

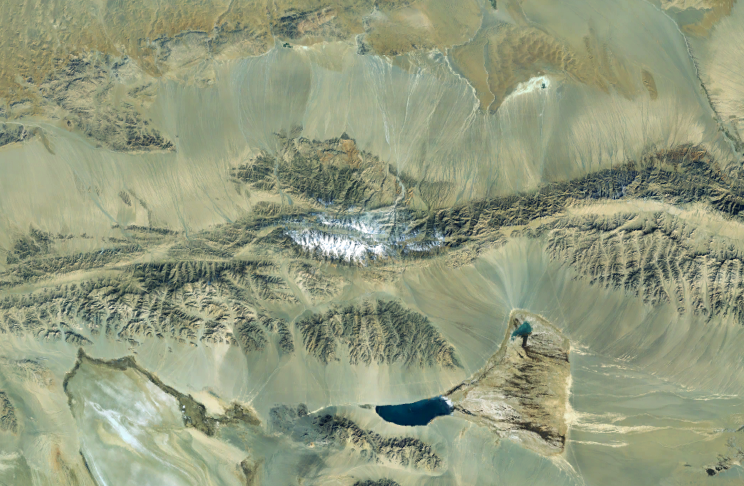
5830 m high Altun Shan mountains formed at a restraining bend on the sinistral Altyn Tagh fault

A fault bend, or fault stepover, forms when individual segments of the fault overlap and link together. The type of structures which form along the strike-slip fault depend on the sense of slip relative to the sense of stepping. When a sinistral fault steps to the right or a dextral fault steps to the left, a restraining bend is formed. Geologists may also refer to a restraining bend as a "left bend". These are areas of positive relief (topographic uplift), crustal shortening, and exhumation of crystalline basement. As seen in deeply eroded outcrop exposures or from subsurface geophysical surveys, restraining bends commonly define positive flower structures. In plan view we see them form contractional strike-slip duplexes, subparallel reverse or oblique-slip contractional faults that are bounded by two strike-slip segments. Restraining bends are widespread on the Earth's surface, from sub-outcrop-scale examples to large scale mountain ranges. They have been theorized to occur on extraterrestrial bodies, like Jupiter's icy moon Europa and on Venus.

Beyond their long-term geological development, restraining bends exert a primary control on modern earthquake dynamics by acting as geometric barriers—often termed "earthquake gates"—that can arrest propagating ruptures. Empirical analyses of historical strike-slip earthquake surface ruptures demonstrate that the probability of a rupture successfully bypassing a fault bend decreases significantly with larger changes in fault strike. For strike-slip events, ruptures rarely propagate through interior bends with angles exceeding approximately 30°, and the passing probability drops below 50% for strike-change angles greater than 25°.

== Transpressional regions ==
- Altai Mountains (Western Mongolia and Southern Siberia, Russia)
- Western Aleutian Subduction Zone
- Gobi Altai (Mongolia)
- "Big Bend" of the San Andreas Fault Zone, (California, USA)
- Alpine Fault in New Zealand
- Galeh–Doz pluton (Sanandaj–Sirjan Zone, Iran)

== See also ==
- Strike-slip tectonics
- Structural geology
- Transtension
