= Thrust fault =

Type of reverse fault that has a dip of 45 degrees or less

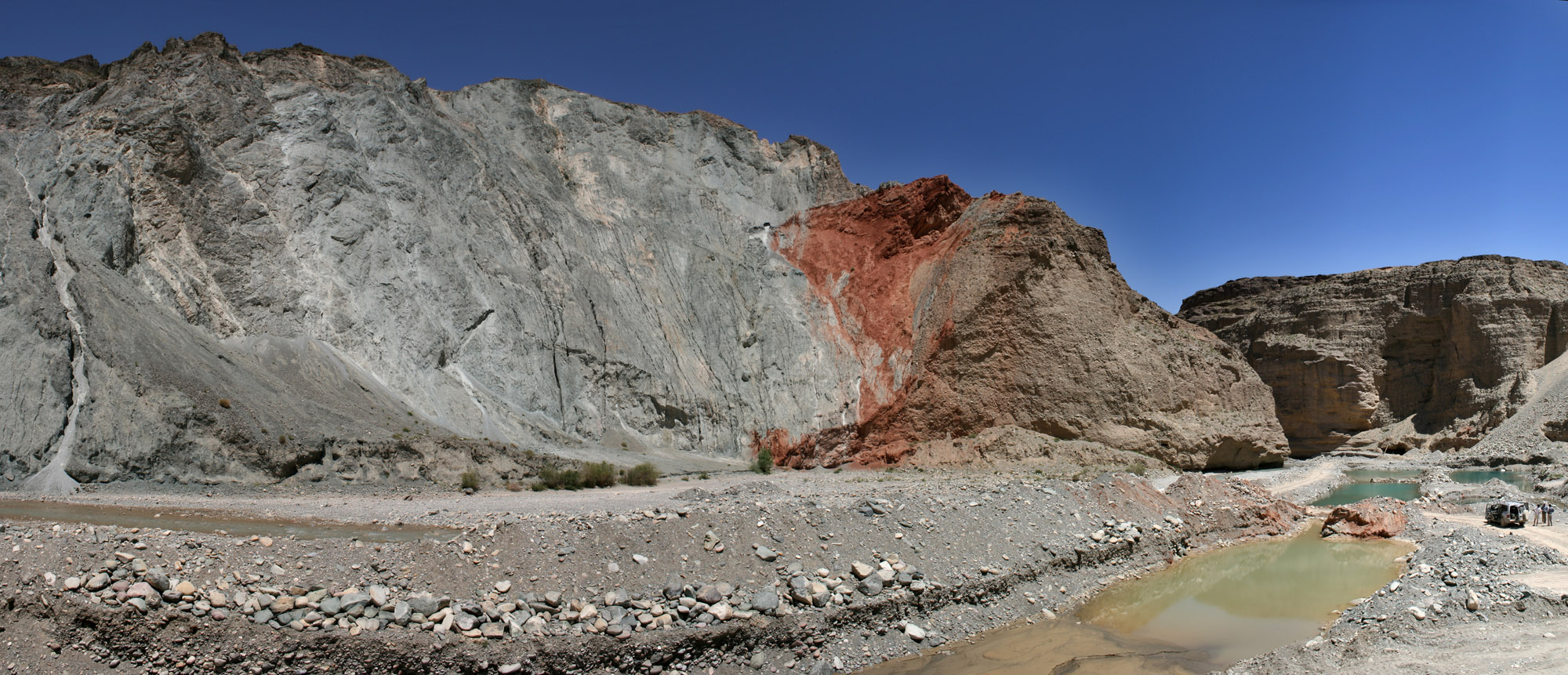
Thrust fault in the Qilian Shan, China. The older (left, blue, and red) thrust over the younger (right, brown).

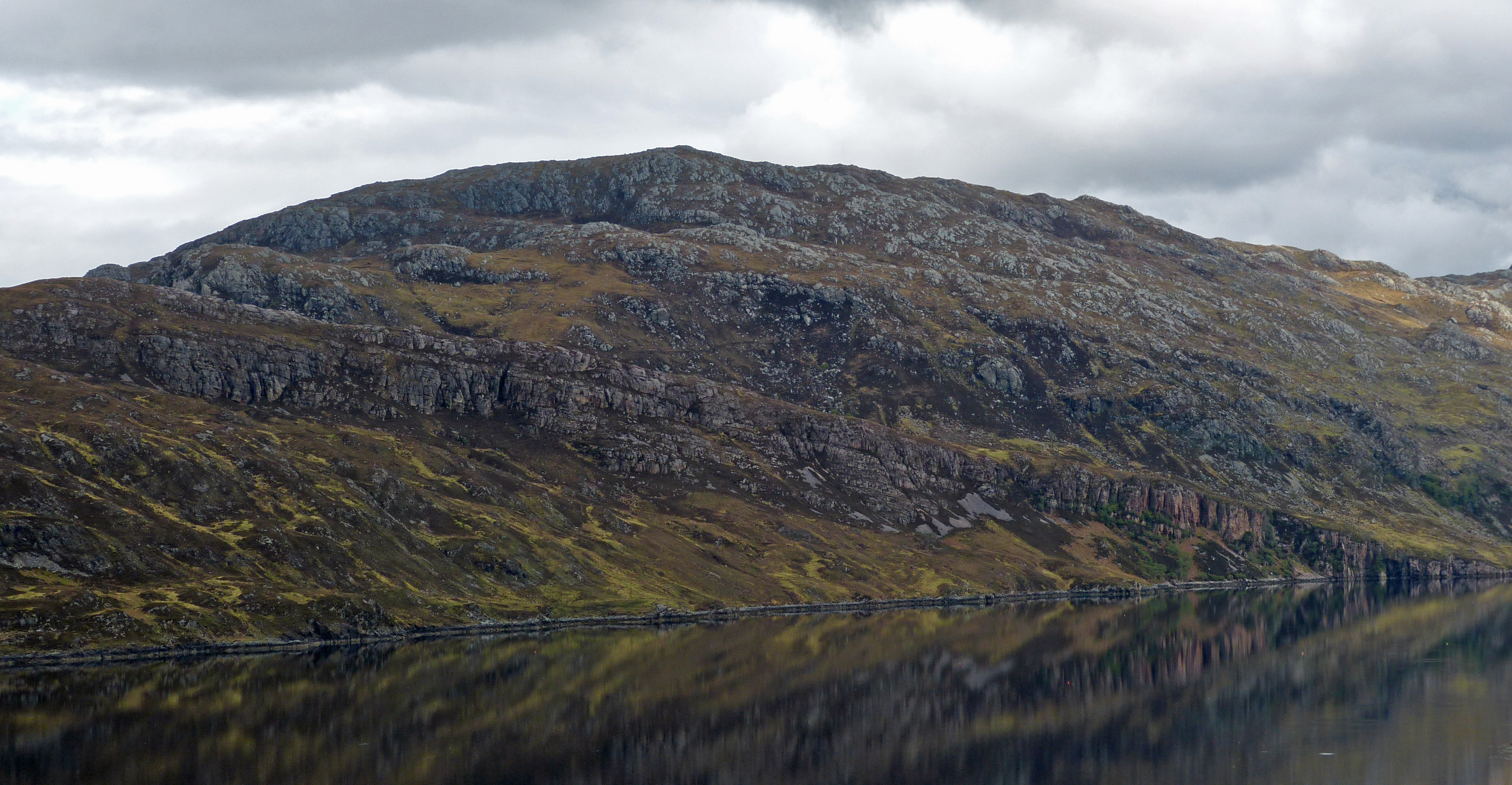
The Glencoul Thrust at Aird da Loch, Assynt in Scotland. The irregular grey mass of rock is formed of Archaean or Paleoproterozoic Lewisian gneisses thrust over well-bedded Cambrian quartzite, along the top of the younger unit.

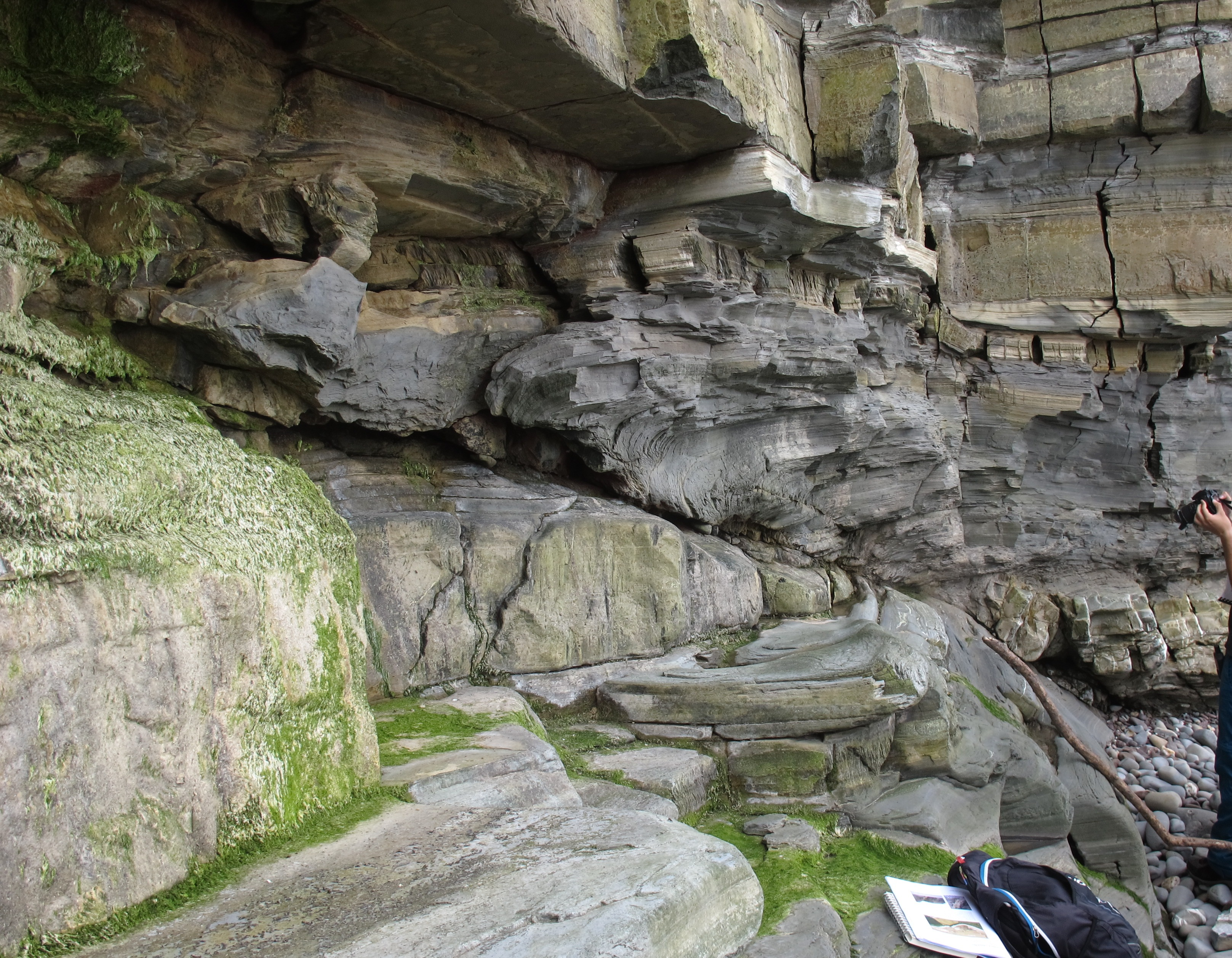
Small thrust fault in the cliffs at Lilstock Bay, Somerset, England; displacement of about two metres (6.6 ft)

A thrust fault is a break in the Earth's crust, across which older rocks are pushed above younger rocks.

== Thrust geometry and nomenclature ==
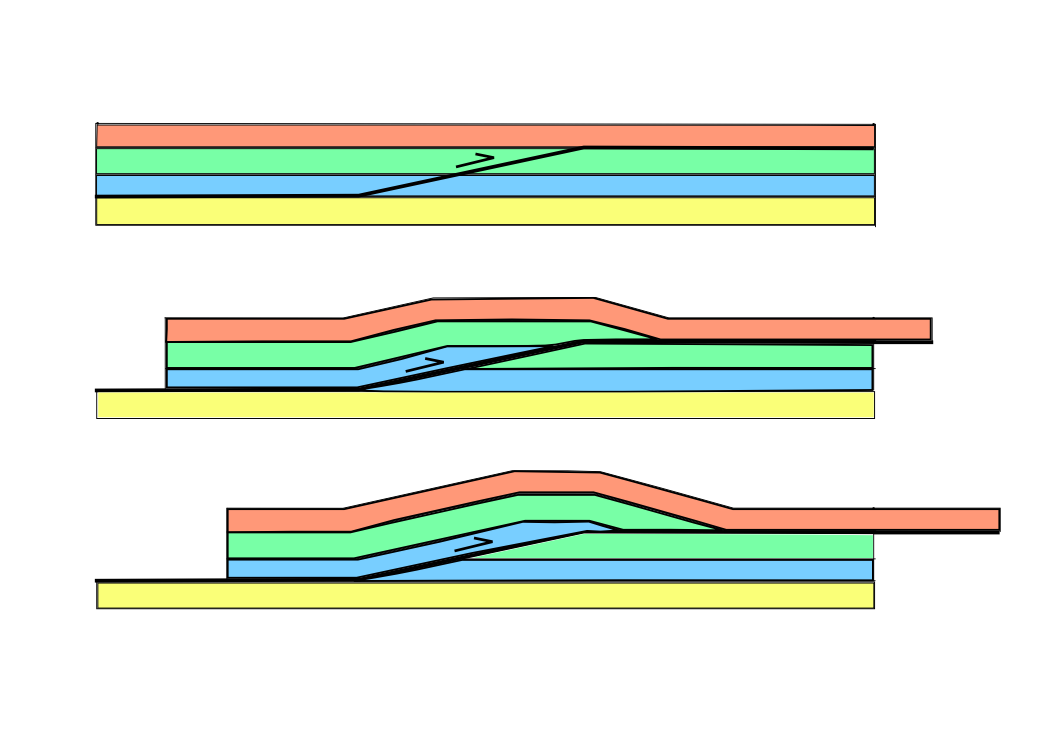
Diagram of the evolution of a fault-bend fold or 'ramp anticline' above a thrust ramp, the ramp links decollements at the top of the green and yellow layers

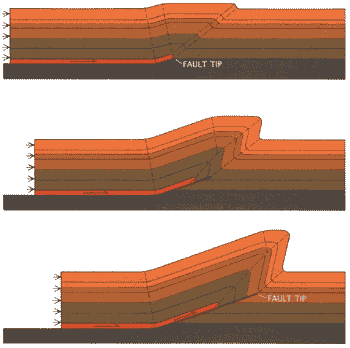
Diagram of the evolution of a fault propagation fold

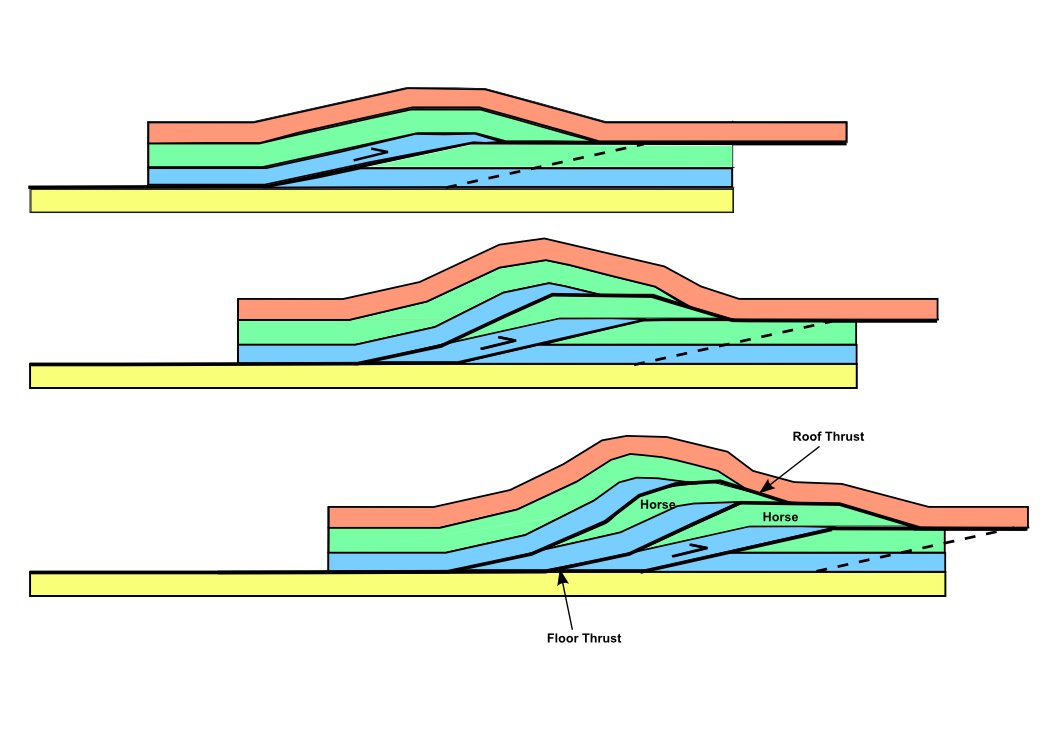
Development of thrust duplex by progressive failure of ramp footwall

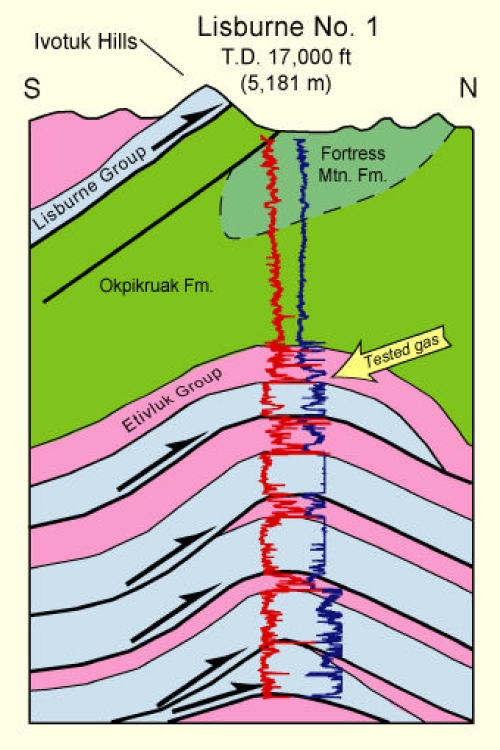
Antiformal stack of thrust imbricates proved by drilling, Brooks Range Foothills, Alaska

=== Reverse faults ===
A thrust fault is a type of reverse fault that has a dip of 45 degrees or less.

If the angle of the fault plane is lower (often less than 15 degrees from the horizontal) and the displacement of the overlying block is large (often in the kilometer range) the fault is called an overthrust or overthrust fault. Erosion can remove part of the overlying block, creating a fenster (or window) – when the underlying block is exposed only in a relatively small area. When erosion removes most of the overlying block, leaving island-like remnants resting on the lower block, the remnants are called klippen (singular klippe).

=== Blind thrust faults ===
If the fault plane terminates before it reaches the Earth's surface, it is called a blind thrust fault. Because of the lack of surface evidence, blind thrust faults are difficult to detect until rupture. The destructive 1994 earthquake in Northridge, Los Angeles, California, was caused by a previously undiscovered blind thrust fault.

Because of their low dip, thrusts are also difficult to appreciate in mapping, where lithological offsets are generally subtle and stratigraphic repetition is difficult to detect, especially in peneplain areas.

=== Fault-bend folds ===
Thrust faults, particularly those involved in thin-skinned style of deformation, have a so-called ramp-flat geometry. Thrusts mainly propagate along zones of weakness within a sedimentary sequence, such as mudstones or halite layers; these parts of the thrust are called decollements. If the effectiveness of the decollement becomes reduced, the thrust will tend to cut up the section to a higher stratigraphic level until it reaches another effective decollement where it can continue as bedding parallel flat. The part of the thrust linking the two flats is known as a ramp and typically forms at an angle of about 15°–30° to the bedding. Continued displacement on a thrust over a ramp produces a characteristic fold geometry known as a ramp anticline or, more generally, as a fault-bend fold.

=== Fault-propagation folds ===
Fault-propagation folds form at the tip of a thrust fault where propagation along the decollement has ceased, but displacement on the thrust behind the fault tip continues. The formation of an asymmetric anticline-syncline fold pair accommodates the continuing displacement. As displacement continues, the thrust tip starts to propagate along the axis of the syncline. Such structures are also known as tip-line folds. Eventually, the propagating thrust tip may reach another effective decollement layer, and a composite fold structure will develop with fault-bending and fault-propagation folds' characteristics.

=== Thrust duplex ===
Duplexes occur where two decollement levels are close to each other within a sedimentary sequence, such as the top and base of a relatively strong sandstone layer bounded by two relatively weak mudstone layers. When a thrust that has propagated along the lower detachment, known as the floor thrust, cuts up to the upper detachment, known as the roof thrust, it forms a ramp within the stronger layer. With continued displacement on the thrust, higher stresses are developed in the footwall of the ramp due to the bend on the fault. This may cause renewed propagation along the floor thrust until it again cuts up to join the roof thrust. Further displacement then takes place via the newly created ramp. This process may repeat many times, forming a series of fault-bounded thrust slices known as imbricates or horses, each with the geometry of a fault-bend fold of small displacement. The final result is typically a lozenge-shaped duplex.

Most duplexes have only small displacements on the bounding faults between the horses, which dip away from the foreland. Occasionally, the displacement on the individual horses is more significant, such that each horse lies more or less vertically above the other; this is known as an antiformal stack or imbricate stack. If the individual displacements are still greater, the horses have a foreland dip.

Duplexing is a very efficient mechanism of accommodating the shortening of the crust by thickening the section rather than by folding and deformation.

== Tectonic environment ==
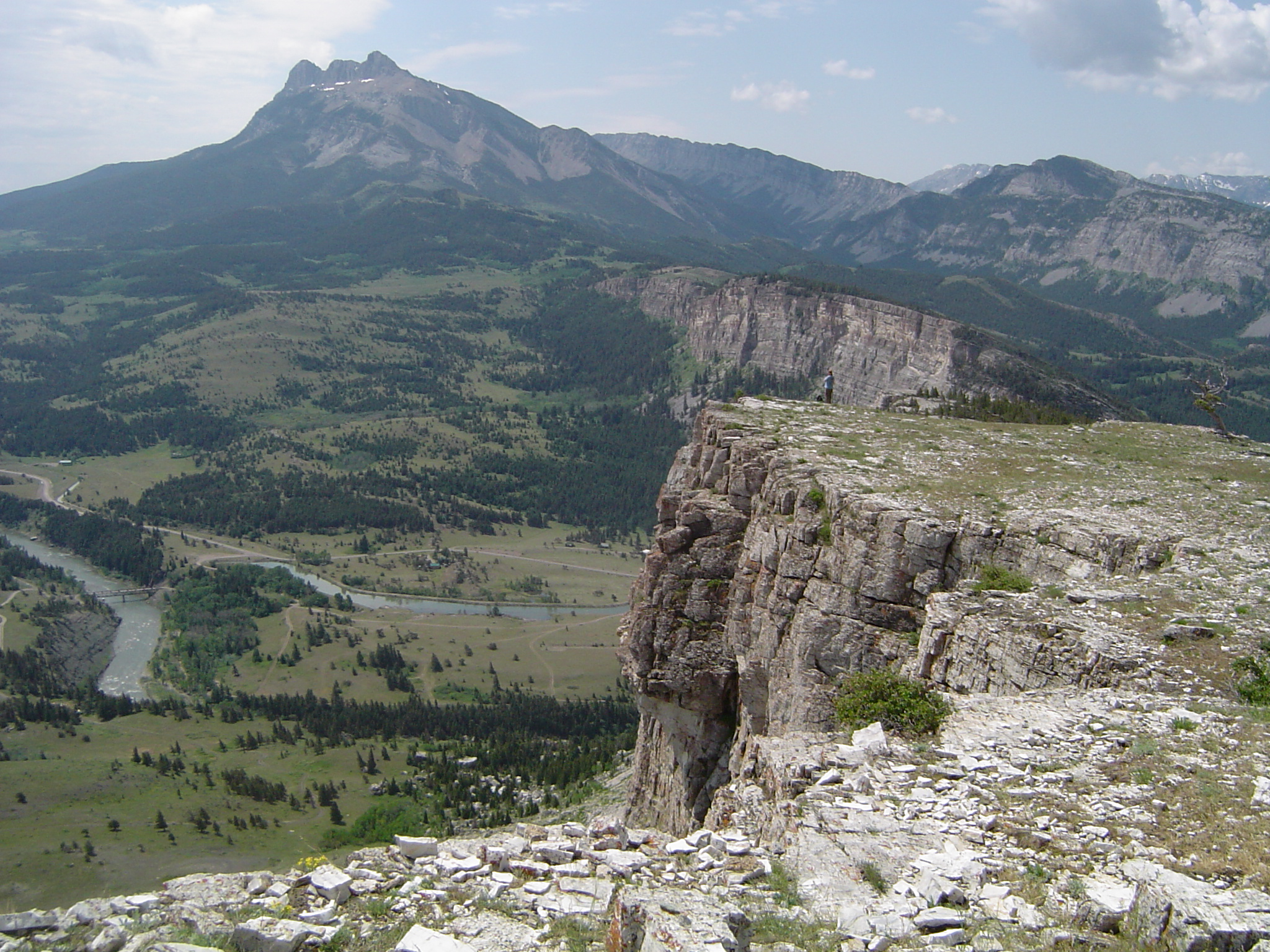
An example of thin-skinned deformation (thrusting) in Montana. Note that the white Madison Limestone is repeated, with one example in the foreground and another at a higher level to the upper right corner and top of the picture.

Large overthrust faults occur in areas subject to intense compressional forces.

These conditions exist in the orogenic belts that result from either two continental tectonic collisions or from subduction zone accretion.

The resultant compressional forces produce mountain ranges. The Himalayas, the Alps, and the Appalachians are prominent examples of compressional orogenies with numerous overthrust faults.

Thrust faults occur in the foreland basin, marginal to orogenic belts. Here, compression does not result in appreciable mountain building, which is mostly accommodated by folding and stacking of thrusts. Instead, thrust faults generally cause a thickening of the stratigraphic section. When thrusts are developed in orogens formed in previously rifted margins, inversion of the buried paleo-rifts can induce the nucleation of thrust ramps.

Foreland basin thrusts also usually observe the ramp-flat geometry, with thrusts propagating within units at very low angle "flats" (at 1–5 degrees) and then moving up-section in steeper ramps (at 5–20 degrees) where they offset stratigraphic units. Thrusts have also been detected in cratonic settings, where "far-foreland" deformation has advanced into intracontinental areas.

Thrusts and duplexes are also found in accretionary wedges in the ocean trench margin of subduction zones, where oceanic sediments are scraped off the subducted plate and accumulate. Here, the accretionary wedge must thicken by up to 200%, and this is achieved by stacking thrust fault upon thrust fault in a melange of disrupted rock, often with chaotic folding. Here, ramp-flat geometries are rarely observed because the compressional force is at a steep angle to the sedimentary layering.

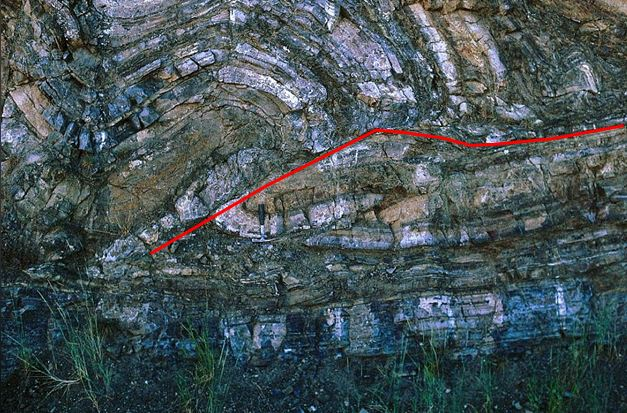
Thrust fault outcrop (red line traces the fault)

== History ==
Thrust faults were unrecognised until the work of Arnold Escher von der Linth, Albert Heim and Marcel Alexandre Bertrand in the Alps working on the Glarus Thrust; Charles Lapworth, Ben Peach and John Horne working on parts of the Moine Thrust in the Scottish Highlands; Alfred Elis Törnebohm in the Scandinavian Caledonides and R. G. McConnell in the Canadian Rockies. The realisation that older strata could, via faulting, be found above younger strata was arrived at more or less independently by geologists in all these areas during the 1880s. Geikie in 1884 coined the term thrust-plane to describe this special set of faults. He wrote:

By a system of reversed faults, a group of strata is made to cover a great breadth of ground and actually to overlie higher members of the same series. The most extraordinary dislocations, however, are those to which for distinction we have given the name of Thrust-planes. They are strictly reversed faults, but with so low a hade that the rocks on their upthrown side have been, as it were, pushed horizontally forward.
