= Transtension =

Transtension is the state in which a rock mass or area of the Earth's crust experiences both extensive and transtensive shear. As such, transtensional regions are characterised by both extensional structures (normal faults, grabens) and wrench structures (strike-slip faults). In general, many tectonic regimes that were previously defined as simple strike-slip shear zones are actually transtensional. It is unlikely that a deforming body will experience 'pure' extension or 'pure' strike-slip.

Transtensional shear zones are characterized by the co-existence of different structures, related to both strike-slip shear and extension. End member structures include pure strike-slip faults and purely extensional ("normal") dip-slip faults. Faults which have components of both (termed "oblique-slip faults") are abundant.

== Releasing bend ==
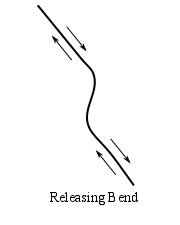
Diagram of fault geometry (in map view) that leads to transtension at the bend or step-over.

Releasing bends are transtensional structures that form where the orientation of a strike-slip fault becomes oblique to the regional slip vector causing local extension (such as a right stepping bend on a right-lateral fault). They also form where two segments of a strike-slip fault overlap, and the relay zone between the segments experiences transtension. Releasing bends often form negative flower structures or pull-apart basins. Geologists may also refer to a releasing bend as a right bend.

== Transtensional regions ==
- Dead Sea
- Salton Sea
- Sea of Marmara on the North Anatolian Fault
- Vienna Basin

== See also ==
- Pull-apart basin
- Rift
- Strike-slip tectonics
- Structural geology
- Transpression
