= Sleepers Awake (band) =

American progressive metal band

- Origin: Columbus, Ohio, United States
- Genres: Progressive rock
- Years active: 2005–present
- Members: Chris Thompson; Kedar Hiremath; Rob Bradley; Chris Burnsides
- Past members: Dan Bilbrey; Eric Grey; Joey Bradley
- Website: SleeperRock.com

Sleepers Awake is a progressive metal band formed in 2005 and based in Columbus, Ohio.

== History ==
Sleepers Awake was formed in 2005 by Chris Thompson and Rob Bradley. Bradley's brother, Joey, later joined the band as a bassist. Dan Bilbrey joined as a drummer, but later that year, he was replaced by Eric Grey. The band released their first EP, Werdegäng, in 2006.

In 2008, Grey was replaced by drummer Chris Burnsides, formerly of Unknown Origin and One Eye Witness.

In 2009, the band released their first full album, Priests of Fire, and they soon after went on a tour consisting of eleven concerts in five different cities.

In 2010, Joey Bradley's spot as bassist was given to Kedar Hiremath. With this lineup, the band released their second album Transcension in 2012. It received a 10 out of 10 from Punk Prospect and a 6 out of 6 from Violence Online.

== Style and influences ==
Sleepers Awake is a self-described progressive rock band, described as influenced by Mastodon, Rush, Queen, Pink Floyd, Opeth, Tool, and Queens of the Stone Age.

== Band members ==
Current members

- Chris Thompson - lead vocals, rhythm guitar (2005 – present)
- Rob Bradley - lead guitar (2005 – present)
- Kedar Hiremath - bass guitar (2010 – present)
- Chris Burnsides - drums, percussion (2008 – present)

Former members

- Dan Bilbrey - drums, percussion (2005–2005)
- Eric Grey - drums, percussion (2005–2008)
- Joey Bradley - bass guitar (2005–2010)

== Discography ==
=== Studio albums ===
- Priests of the Fire (2009)
- Transcension (2012)

=== EPs ===
- Werdegäng (2006)
