= Paphia =

Paphia is the scientific name of two genera of organisms and may refer to:

- Paphia (bivalve), a genus of bivalves in the family Veneridae
- Paphia (plant), a genus of plants in the family Ericaceae
