= Aksu Basin =

The Aksu Basin is a sedimentary basin in southwestern Turkey, around the present-day Aksu River. Located at the intersection of several major tectonic systems, in the Isparta Angle, the Aksu Basin covers an area of some 2000 square kilometers. Together with the Köprü Çay Basin and the Manavgat Basin, the Aksu Basin forms part of the broader Antalya Basin. It forms a graben relative to the surrounding Anatolian plateau.

The Aksu Basin has been gradually filling up with sediment since Neogene times.

== General description ==
The Aksu Basin is located at an important intersection of several tectonic systems. To the north, the Anatolian continental plateau is undergoing uplift, while to the south the African and Eurasian plates are colliding, producing features like the Mediterranean Ridge and the Hellenic subduction zone. On the west, the Aksu Basin is bounded by the Bey Dağları platform carbonates, where the crust is extending to produce a series of grabens and horsts that are mostly east-west aligned. To the east, the Aksu Thrust separates the Aksu Basin from the Köprü Çay Basin. (Note: According to Kaya, the so-called Aksu Thrust does not exist and is instead a "dextral, transtensional fault".)

Part of the broader Antalya Basin, which is itself located within the Isparta Angle, the Aksu Basin can be divided into two sub-basins: in the north is the older Aksu-Karpuzçay sub-basin, and in the south is the younger Yenimahalle-Çalkaya sub-basin. The southern part of the basin is "now very heavily karstified and vegetated."

The Aksu Basin overlies basement rocks of several types: Bey Dağları platform carbonates, Alanya Metamorphics, Antalya Nappes (made of ophiolite) and Lycian Nappes (platform carbonate). An unconformity separates the basin from these basement rocks.

In front of the mouth of the Aksu River, there is a broad, shallow marine shelf offshore where the present-day sediments of the Aksu River are deposited. In the past, this area was deeper; according to Poisson et al., there was likely a canyon, as there still is over by the Düden and Karaman mouths near Antalya, but this canyon has since been filled in by Quaternary deposition from the Aksu River.

The Aksu Basin is considered a sedimentary basin and a foreland basin. It has been infilling since Neogene times.

There are five fan deltas in the Aksu Basin: Kapıkaya, Kozan, Karadağ, Kargı, and Bucak. There is also the Eskiköy alluvial fan.

Along with the neighboring Köpru and Manavgat Basins, the Aksu Basin has been of interest to geologists since the 1910s thanks to its "rich tectonic complexities and well-exposed structural and sedimentary features".

The Aksu Basin covers some 2000 square kilometers.

== Evolution ==
The Aksu Basin is formed by a combination of several geological processes, including uplift of the Tauride Mountains to the north, rifting within the Isparta Angle, and relative subsidence of the region to the south that now forms Antalya Bay.

According to Glover and Robertson, the upper Aksu Basin was formed by "erosion, then subsidence" in the Miocene: a foreland basin, after and related to the SE-ward emplacement of the Lycian Nappes. Then in the Pliocene and Pleistocene there was crustal extension or transtension to form the lower Aksu Basin.

The pre-Miocene basement primarily consisted of the Bey Dağlari platform, surrounded by the Antalya Nappes, and covered by a thin layer of Paleogene sedimentary deposition. This formed "an eroded flat surface [that] covered a large area in SW Turkey". Beginning in the Late Oligocene, and continuing through the Burdigalian, rising sea levels caused a marine transgression in the area. The shallow marine Karabayir Limestones were deposited in the north and west, forming a large platform around what is now the Aksu Basin. Meanwhile, to the south, a molassic basin was formed; this was the beginning of the Antalya Basin as a whole.

=== Miocene ===
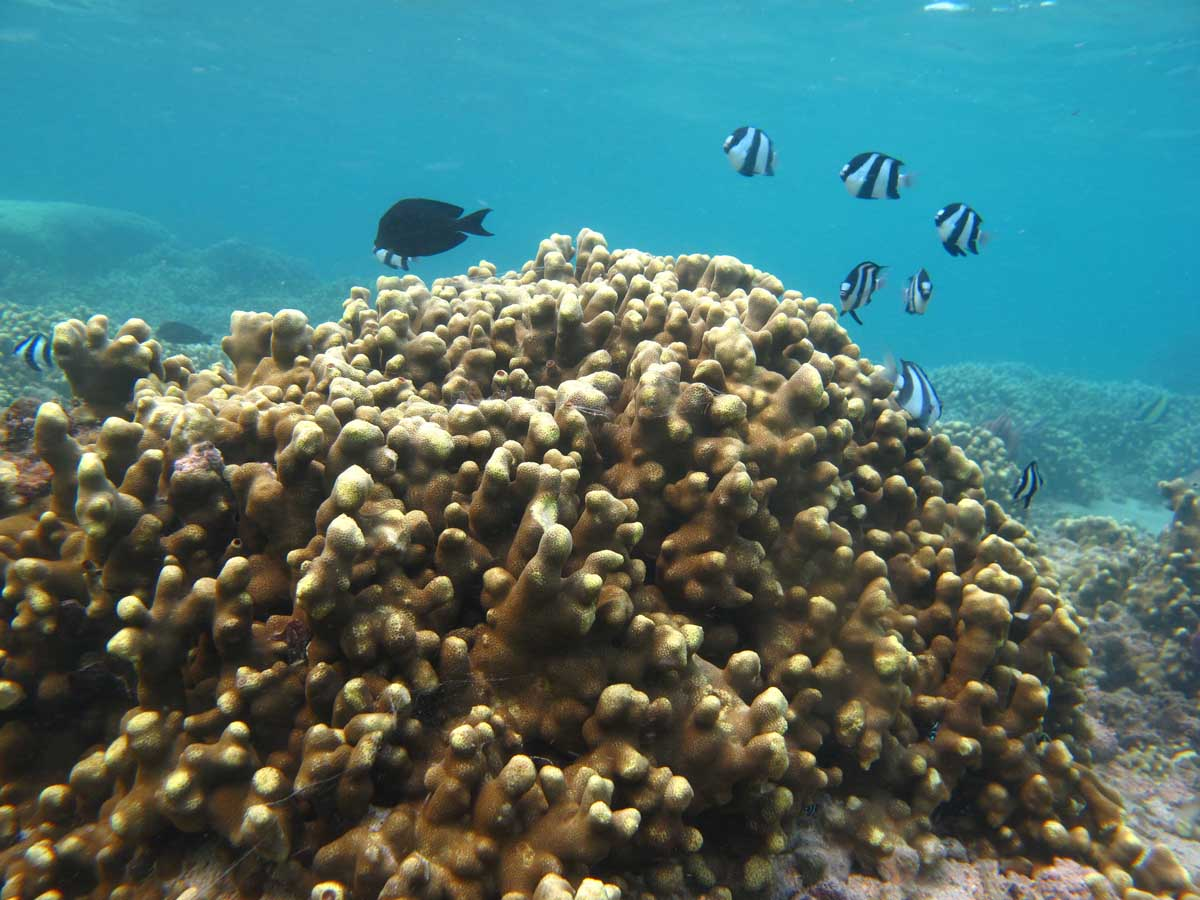
In the Middle Miocene, coral reefs dotted the coast in the Aksu Basin. Porites, pictured here, was one of the predominant genera.

By the Early Miocene, a "right-lateral transform fault plate boundary" had formed between the Cyprus Trench and the Isparta Angle. This led to the creation of "a hybrid, terrestrial-shallow marine accommodation space" on the eastern side of the Isparta Angle, where sediments from the Antalya Complex further east were deposited.

In the Middle Miocene (c. 16-11 MYA), the Aksu Basin was formed as a graben cutting through the Karabayir platform. Meanwhile, the surrounding continental areas were being pushed upward; erosion from these areas provided a lot of sediment that was poured into the emerging Aksu Basin. According to Kaya, this was especially the case with the rapidly uplifting Antalya Complex to the east; it "provided the topographic gradient and gravitational potential energy for the necessary fluvial erosion and transport for sediment supply". Poisson et al. instead highlight the basin's northern and western margins, where a series of fan deltas at prehistoric river mouths left thick sediment deposits – for example, the present-day Kapıkaya and Kargı fan deltas.

The Aksu and Karpuzçay Formations were deposited during this period in what Kaya describes as "fluvial, deltaic to beach environments". Coral reefs fringed the coastline. These reefs lay on a "warm, well-aerated shallow marine shelf" in the photic zone. The low species diversity – primarily colonies of Porites and Tarbaellastraea – may indicate a "stressed" environment. The shore was "medium-high wave energy-dominated", and the climate was temperate to subtropical. The presence of coral fossils among the fan delta deposits is likely from periods when sudden sea level increase left the deltas underwater. Traces of coral reefs at Kargı and Sütçüler have been dated to Late Tortonian times.

Around 5.6 MYA, the Mediterranean region was hit by the Messinian salinity crisis. Sea levels dropped tremendously, and there was rapid erosion and desiccation. Growth of the fan deltas stopped as the receding coastline left the entire Aksu Basin on land. Deep gorges were carved in the areas that were now exposed as dry land. One of them, now a deep undersea canyon in the Gulf of Antalya, is still traceable in front of the present day Düden and Karaman river mouths. A similar canyon likely existed on the Aksu, but it has since been buried by Quaternary sedimentation on the marine shelf.

Poisson et al. reconstructed the course of the Aksu River around the end of the Messinian (c. 5.3 MYA) this way: the river flowed through the Eskiköy Canyon, then "crossed the Antalya alluvial plain before joining the Antalya abyssal plain, through the actively cutting Antalya canyon".

Poisson et al. also argued that the Gebiz Limestone was formed during the Messinian, implying that there was still at least a pocket of sea in the Aksu Basin even while the sea retreated. They characterize this environment as "very shallow marine", with coral reefs, which then gradually became more restricted as it gave way to land and eventually dried up completely. This characterization is disputed – Üner et al. instead describe the Gebiz Limestone as being deposited after sea levels rose again; Kaya attributes the Gebiz Limestone to the "latest Miocene-early Pliocene", describing it as being deposited by a NW-SE-oriented lake that formed during this period.

According to Kaya's interpretation, the Aksu Basin was a "fluvial, fluvial-delta, beach setting" during the Middle Miocene (c. 16-11 MYA), then "a lacustrine and lagoon environment" by the end of the Miocene (i.e. c. 5.3 MYA). Then, during the early Pliocene (c. 5.3-3.6 MYA), there was a relatively brief (at least geologically speaking) period of tidal flat and very shallow marine conditions. Later, there was a "return to entirely terrestrial conditions", and deposition by the ancient Aksu River formed the Belkis Conglomerate during the Pleistocene period.

=== Pliocene ===
Sea levels rose again in the early Pliocene, during the Zanclean period (c. 5.3-3.6 MYA). The southern part of the Aksu Basin was submerged, while the northern part remained dry land. The Messinian canyons became filled in by new deposition. The Eskiköy canyon was at first completely submerged, as fossils of nannoplankton and planktonic foraminifera found in marl deposits suggest a shallow, "open-marine" environment. It then became "completely filled" by these marl deposits, then deltaic conglomerate deposits, and finally lacustrine marl deposits.

Meanwhile, by the latest Miocene/early Pliocene, continued tectonic activity had caused the Aksu Basin (specifically the present-day northern part, the Aksu-Karpuzçay sub-basin) to become uplifted and tilted towards the south. Deposition was now happening further south, forming the Yenimahalle-Çalkaya sub-basin. Sediment was now coming from the Bey Dağları platform to the west, which had been uplifted in the meantime.

Rising sea levels had left the Yenimahalle-Çalkaya sub-basin underwater, leading to what Üner et al. describe as a shallow marine shelf environment. (Note: Kaya describes it instead as "a hybrid environment of salt and fresh water setting in tidal flats and delta fronts".) Üner et al. attribute the alluvial fan-delta of the Eskiköy Formation, and the "shallow marine siltstone-marl alternations" of the Yenimahalle Formation to this period. According to Kaya, the Yenimahalle and Çalkaya Formations were deposited during this period.

In the Late Pliocene (c. 3.6-2.6 MYA), sea levels dropped and the southern Aksu Basin once again became dry land. On the western side of the basin, the Antalya Fault spawned cold springs, which produced the Antalya tufa and travertine deposits.

=== Quaternary ===
During the Quaternary period, the Aksu River cut a new gorge – not in the same place as the Eskiköy canyon; the river's course had changed in the meantime.

=== Pleistocene ===
Since in the early-mid Pleistocene, Earth has experienced an alternating series of glacial and interglacial periods, which "superimposed their effects" on the ongoing geological processes in the region. Anatolia has been experiencing relative uplift, while the Aksu Basin has been experiencing relative subsidence to form an extensional graben. A fluctuating climate affected the river systems, and aggradation in the central part of the basin created fluvial terraces. Terra rossa-type soils formed on top of Mesozoic limestone and were redeposited into channels during flash floods. At the beginning of the middle Pleistocene, global fluctuations in sea level increased, and a marine incursion may have eroded the lower part of the basin, although no marine sediments have been found in this area. Also around the mid-Pleistocene, a small fan was deposited at the mouth of the Karaman River. Also during this time, the most recent layer of the Aksu Basin was formed: the Belkis Conglomerate, in the middle Pleistocene, by fluvial terraces.

=== Now ===
At the present day, tectonic activity in the Aksu Basin is minimal, and there is also relatively little sedimentary deposition. Instead, erosion is the primary activity, such as cave systems and sinkholes forming in the Antalya Tufa. The Aksu River also continues to form fluvial terraces along its course.

== Component strata ==
The stratigraphy of the Aksu Basin is well documented, although the specific delineation of formation names, ages, and boundaries are varied. This article follows Kaya's terminology.

=== Aksu Formation ===
According to Ersin Kaya, the Aksu Formation is the oldest layer of the Aksu Basin. (Note: According to Üner et al, the Karpuzçay Formation is instead the oldest, although it "interfingers" with the Aksu Formation.) It is mixed with the similar-aged Karpuzçay Formation. Based on fossil records, the Aksu Formation has been dated to the Langhian through Tortonian periods (i.e. c. 16-7 MYA). Its maximum thickness is about 1200 m. The Aksu Formation's type localities are in the northeast and northwest parts of the Aksu Basin. The formation's composition is somewhat varied in different places. The western part of the Aksu Formation consists of "poorly sorted conglomerate and conglomeratic sandstone... composed of rounded clasts of fine-grained, beige micritic Jurassic limestone and Triassic light gray limestone and yellow sandstone". In the east, the formation contains "abundant clasts of red and green radiolarites, Triassic hallobia-bearing sandstone, and ophiolitic rocks (serpentinite, dolerite, basaltic volcanic rocks". Near the eastern edge of the basin, the Aksu Formation directly overlies the Triassic basement rocks along an angular unconformity.

Less commonly, blocks of reefal limestone are present. These blocks contain fossils of the corals Stylophora, Helliastraea, Plesiastraea, Favia, Tarbellastraea, and Porites.

=== Karpuzçay Formation ===
With a maximum thickness of 1500 m, the Karpuzçay Formation is the single most extensive formation in the Aksu Basin. It is approximately equal in date to the Aksu Formation, also being dated to the Langhian and Tortonian based on fossils. It is either slightly older or slightly younger than the Aksu Formation; in either case, the two are mixed together in many places.

The Karpuzçay Formation mostly comprises alternating layers of conglomerate, sandstone, and mudstone. The conglomerate layers have clasts made of chert, serpentinite, and various types of limestone. Sandstones vary in color from grey to green to dirty yellow. They have cross-bedding, cross-lamination, and pronounced graded bedding. Layers of tuffaceous sandstone are commonly mixed in with conglomerate or conglomeratic sandstone layers. Mudstone layers are usually laminated and contain concretions ranging from 15 to 20 mm.

=== Gebiz Limestone ===
The Gebiz Limestone unconformably overlies the Karpuzçay Formation at its type locality near the town of Gebiz in the southeastern part of the Aksu Basin. In some places along the basin's eastern edge, it is instead faulted against the Triassic-Jurassic rocks of the Antalya Complex. More within the basin, it is faulted against younger basement strata in some places. It is dated to the Upper Miocene, although the exact time period is disputed. It is variously dated to the Messinian or Tortonian. Its maximum thickness is about 40 m, in its type locality near the town of Gebiz. The Gebiz Limestone consists mainly of bioclastic limestone, marl, claystone, and mudstone. In some areas, there are reefal limestone deposits.

The largest continuous exposed stretch of the Gebiz Limestone lies along the southeastern edge of the Aksu Basin; it runs parallel to the edge of the basin.

=== Eskiköy Formation ===
The main exposed outcroppings of the Eskiköy Formation are found in the middle part of the basin. Here, it generally sits on top of the Aksu and Karpuzçay Formations, separated from them by an unconformity. In some places, it instead lies on top of Triassic-Jurassic recrystallized limestones belonging to the Antalya Complex, either separated from them by an unconformity or faulted against them.

The Eskiköy Formation primarily consists of sandy conglomerate and sandstone, with interspersed layers of mudstone. The conglomerate is "poorly sorted with mostly rounded pebbles and clasts of Jurassic micritic limestone, and Triassic chert and basaltic rocks". The formation's maximum depth is estimated at 300 m.

Akay et al. interpreted the Eskiköy Formation as a lateral equivalent of the Gebiz Limestone, meaning that they date from the same time.

Fossils found in the Eskiköy Formation's marl include several species of planktonic foraminifera: Orbulina, Biorbulina, Globigerinoides (multiple species: trilobus, obliquus extremus, obliquus s.s., bollii, emeisi, and aperture), and Globigerinita incrusta. Based on these planktonic foraminifera fossils, Poisson et al. dated the formation to the Upper Miocene, which is consistent with Akay et al.'s interpretation.

=== Yenimahalle Formation ===
The Yenimahalle Formation is best exposed in two areas: around Yenimahalle in the southwestern part of the Aksu River valley, and around Gebiz in the east. It lies conformably on top of the Gebiz and Eskiköy Formations; i.e. they are not separated by an unconformity. The Çalkaya Formation sits on top of it. Around the village of Dorumlar, the Yenimahalle Formation is overlain by the Belkis Conglomerate, with an unconformity between them. The total thickness of the Yenimahalle Formation is about 250 m. Evidence of a prehistoric river delta from this stage has also been detected offshore based on seismic lines.

The Yenimahalle Formation is made up of "blue-grey siltstone with embedded sandstone and graded gravelstone". There is also conglomerate included in the formation's upper layers. Characteristic features of the Yenimahalle formation include "low-angle cross-bedding and lamination, trough cross-bedding, ripple lamination, fining upwards sand channels, and gravel/conglomerate lenses". In some places, sandstone concretions are common. Tuff deposits can also be found in some places, caused by "local, small phreatomagmatic eruptions".

The presence of "Margaritae and Punctulate zones" in lower parts of the formation near Gebiz indicate that the formation can be dated to the Lower Pliocene. A number of fossilized bivalve and gastropod mollusk shells have been found in the Yenimahalle Formation, including Acanthocardia, Ostrea, Cerastoderma edule, Paphia, Dentalis, Gibbula, Fusinus, and Pectens.

Glover and Robertson interpreted the Yenimahalle Formation as "a fine-grained shallow-marine shelf deposit". There do not seem to have been many coarse-grained deposits in this area, leading them to conclude that the river system depositing sediment here had a low gradient and relatively little bedload compared to total load. Based on foraminifera fossils, they estimated that the Yenimahalle Formation was deposited with a water depth under 150 meters, then gradually getting shallower to a depth of under 50 meters "for a significant period".

=== Çalkaya Formation ===
The Çalkaya Formation rests on top of the Yenimahalle Formation. Glover and Robertson interpreted the Çalkaya Formation as "a combination of the Pliocene Alakilise and Eskiköy Formations", but Kaya interpreted it as a separate formation since there is "no observable direct contact between them".

==== Composition ====
The Çalkaya Formation consists of marly siltstone, sandstone, and conglomerate.Its lower part is similar in composition to the upper part of the Yenimahalle Formation. Siltstone layers in the Çalkaya Formation are interspersed with coal seams measuring 25–30 cm in thickness.

Common features of the Çalkaya Formation include "low-angle cross-bedding, through cross-bedding, ripple lamination, and hummocky cross-stratification. In some places, the sediment's grain size increases significantly as it goes towards upper layers, getting coarser and eventually giving way to conglomerate.

The Çalkaya Formation's sandstone deposits are similar in composition to those of the Yenimahalle Formation. Glover and Robertson interpreted the Çalkaya sandstone as "shallow marine in origin, subject to occasional storm activity". Throughout the Çalkaya Formation, there are small conglomerate deposits. Towards the south, around Çalkaya itself, there are "much larger conglomerate bodies" that "crop out as topographic ridges". Like the sandstone, the Çalkaya conglomerates are also "marine in origin, as indicated by the evidence of pebbles bored by sponges and marine bivalves". Some fossils of barnacles and bivalves attached to pebbles and marine shells are found.

The "pebble segregation and low lenticularlity" in the Çalkaya Formation's conglomerate indicates that it was well-worked by waves. In some places, "small lenticular pebble bodies within well-sorted sands" may represent what Glover and Robertson described as "lag concentrations within the lower shoreface zone, possibly a result of accumulation in hollows, or as storm deposits". Some "channelized" conglomerates also contain evidence of prehistoric sandbars.

Paleosols (prehistoric soils) are fairly common in the formation. These are typically 1 or 2 meters thick and are "pale, brown Mediterranean-type soils".

Throughout the formation, there are thin layers of white, carbonate-rich claystone (less than 1 meter thick). According to Glover and Robertson, these claystones were deposited "from hypersaline waters in undisturbed isolated, evaporative lagoons and pools".

==== Fossils ====
Fossils found in the Çalkaya Formation are basically the same as those found in the Yenimahalle Formation. In general, gastropod and bivalve fossils in the Çalkaya Formation are larger than their equivalents in the upper Yenimahalle Formation. In some places, "exceptionally large" fossils of the gastropod Murex have been found. Other fossils found in the Çalkaya include foraminifera, ostracods, and "abundant" bivalve and gastropod mollusks. The Çalkaya Formation has been dated to the Pliocene or Upper Pliocene.

In some places, the fossil assemblage consists entirely of salinity-tolerant species, such as Cerastoderma edule or thin-shelled oysters, which Glover and Robertson interpreted as "suggestive of a brackish-water environment".

==== Formation ====
In the period after the Yenimahalle Formation was deposited, there was a rapid retreat in the coastline. The coarse-grained Çalkaya Formation was then deposited at the Aksu River's delta. A small alluvial fan developed at the Aksu River's emergence point (Note: Defined as the point where an underground stream rises up or emerges from underground in a karstic area.) – which appears to have stayed in basically the same place since at least the Mid-Miocene, since this alluvial fan cuts into fanglomerate from the earlier Aksu Formation. Further south, the fan deposits gradually transitions into a sedimentary plain. A braided stream traversed this plain, eroding the underlying marine sediments of the Yenimahalle Formation. This alluvial plain does not appear to have grown towards the south over time, indicating that "the fluvial regression was sufficiently rapid that the river system was unable to keep pace with a retreating shoreline."

Instead, most of the southern basin area was covered by "a sandy, wave-influenced, delta-top environment", with the offshore waters having a very gentle slope and a lot of sandbars. The larger conglomerate bodies now found in the Çalkaya Formation may have been sandbars running parallel to the coast, possibly including "mouth bars along a wave-influenced fluvial delta distributary front".

=== Antalya Tufa ===
The southwestern boundary of the Aksu Basin is marked by a 30 km by 40 km area of tufa and travertine deposits. This area includes the city of Antalya as well as an undersea portion submerged beneath the Gulf of Antalya. The Antalya Tufa "crops out as a series of major terraces that dominate the present-day landscape".

The deposits get progressively thicker towards the west — from 30 m thick in the east to 250 m thick in the west. No absolute age is given for these deposits, but they lie conformably on top of the Çalkaya Formation. Two sets of "conjugate oblique-slip faults" run northwest–southeast and northeast–southwest along the length of the entire formation.

The lowermost (oldest) tufa deposits are made of "clay-rich microcrystalline carbonates, rich in gastropods". In areas where the deposit directly abuts the Mesozoic basement, particularly on the west, there are clasts of peridotite. These deposits "grade upward into pure microcrystalline tufa, with regular interbedded carbonate-rich paleosols", which predominates for 10 m. Above that, the composition becomes more varied. Incised channels contain brecciated tufa that was deposited in shallow-water and marsh environments. Finally, the uppermost 10 m "consists almost entirely of phytoclast tufa".

==== Formation ====
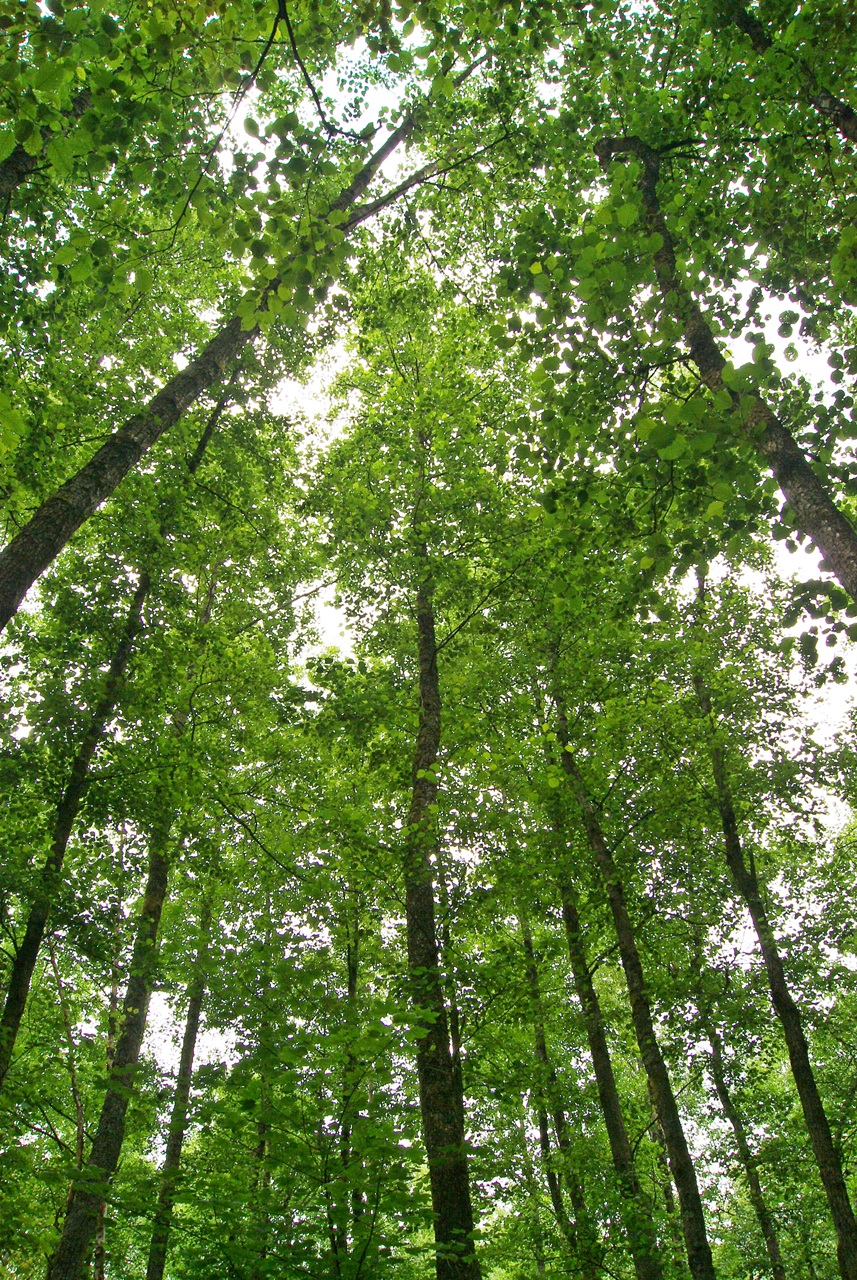
The common alder (Alnus glutinosa) grew in the Aksu Basin when the Antalya Tufa was being deposited, but is no longer native to the area.

The Antalya Tufa was formed by cold springs in the early Pleistocene. This deposition happened "after extensional faulting had largely ceased within the main Aksu Basin". Some depositional features about the Antalya Tufa, such as the lack of detrital material, indicate that the waters originated from springs instead of as run off from the surrounding mountains. In addition, "The location of the palaeo-Aksu River with its coarse sediment input might explain why tufa was not deposited further east".

Extensive karst systems supplied large volumes of water that had been supersaturated with carbonates, from the carbonate geology in the nearby Taurus Mountains. These waters came from lakes further north (as much as 100 km away), as well as from a now-dry polje system further south at Kestel. A cluster of springs at Kırkgöz ("forty springs"), in the northwestern part of the Aksu Basin, was one of the main sources where these carbonated waters came to the surface, but other springs no doubt also existed.

At this time, the Aksu plain would have been dominated by lakes and wetlands, with water depths ranging from centimeters to meters. In some local depressions, water may have been up to 20 m deep. Various small rivers and streams, no more than about 10 m wide, meandered across a relatively flat plain, "constantly reworking friable carbonate deposits through which they passed".

At first, tufa deposition was probably restricted to small lakes, such as near Kırkgöz. On the basin's eastern margin, deposition was primarily algal, "perhaps reflecting the presence of a localized shallow 'lagoon' in close proximity to source waters". Eventually, this deposition gradually filled up any pre-existing depressions and began happening in a broader area. This was the main phase of tufa deposition. In later periods, the overlying phytoclast and phytotherm deposits (which now form the uppermost deposits) were formed at a time "when spring-water supply was reduced, probably during a time of drier climate".

Deposition of the Antalya Tufa may have all taken place during one climactic period. Preserved plants – such as Lonicera, Viburnum, and Alnus glutinosa – "would have thrived in a climate that was cooler and damper than at present". In particular, the presence of Alnus glutinosa (the common alder) confirms that the tufa is not recent in date, since this tree is no longer extant in the region. The presence of another tree – Parrotia persica, or the Persian ironwood – also suggests that most of the deposition had occurred before the onset of the Quaternary glaciation.

Significant tufa deposition had probably ended by the mid-Pleistocene. The glacial periods that began afterwards were too cold and wet for extensive tufa formation, while the interglacial periods were too arid.

Since then, various processes have continued to modify the Antalya Tufa, even though the main deposition has stopped. Erosion has formed "well developed terracing of the Antalya plain", and continued deposition on these terraces still continues, "producing a thin veneer of slope pools, waterfall deposits, and terrace mound deposits in localized areas". This more recent deposition is probably the reason why some radiometric dating attempts "has yielded anomalously young ages" for the Antalya tufa.

Today, tufa deposition is minimal, even though there is still a supply of carbonate-supersatured water at Kırkgöz and other springs. Minor deposition continues at waterfalls and small streams, and "fine carbonates also precipitate at source springs and areas of ephemeral water supply, where algal mats remain after evaporation of shallow water."

==== Terra rossa paleosols ====
Throughout the Antalya Tufa, there are small pockets of bright red terra rossa paleosols that were redeposited here in ancient times. They are mostly found in steep-sided, U-shaped channels, often spaced closely together (some 5 m apart). These channels are mostly cut into Pleistocene fluvial conglomerates, but in some localized areas there are some cut into sedimentary deposits. Originally, these channels "were apparently cut and filled by catastrophic events, probably flash floods".

Glover and Robertson note that the terra rossa paleosols found in the Antalya Tufa are not technically "ideal terra rossa" - they are "too depleted in carbonate" and "enriched in foreign materials" to fit the technical definition. Regardless, this type of soil typically forms on top of limestone, in areas with a hot and dry summer climate.

=== Belkis Conglomerate ===
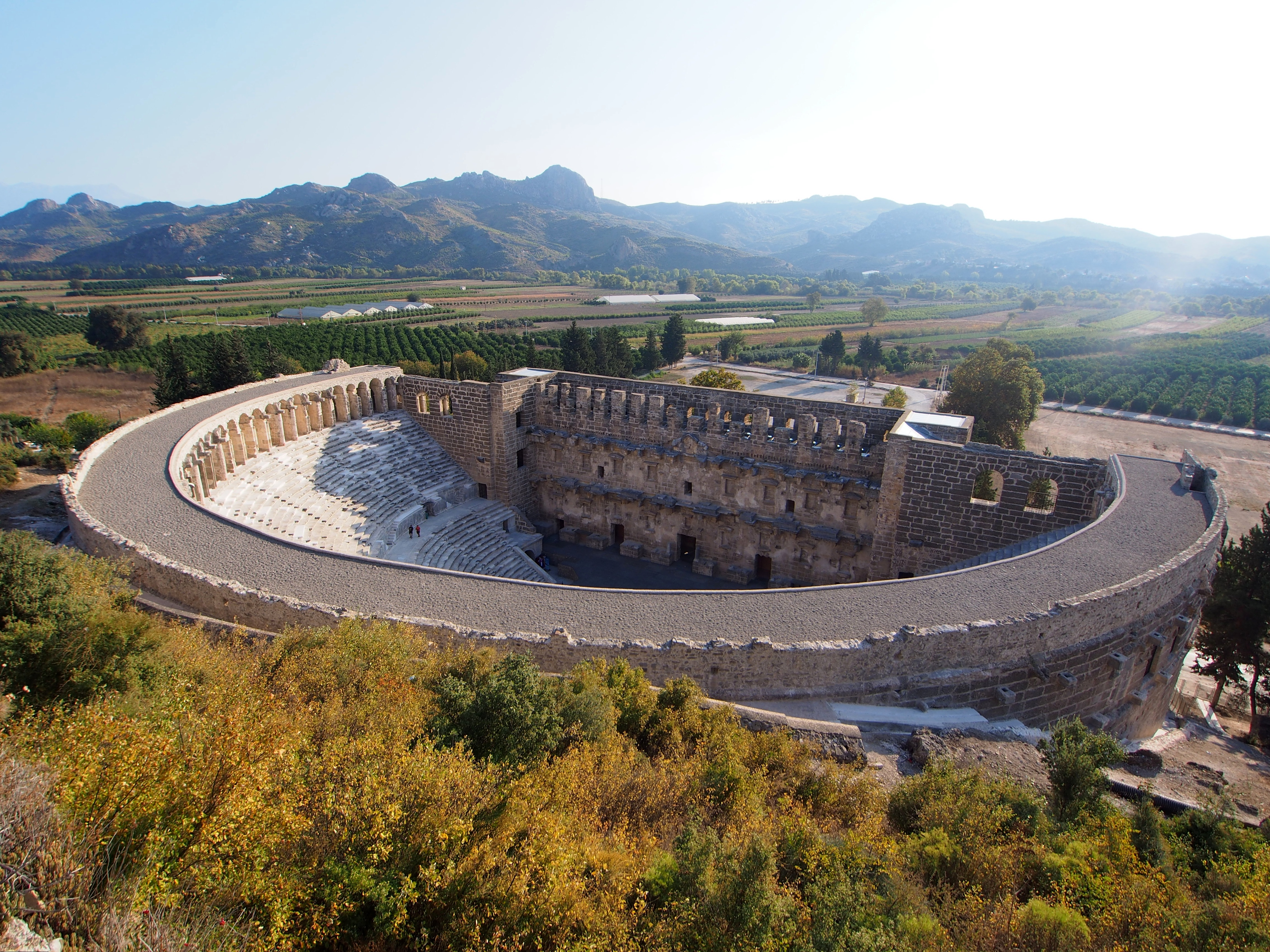
The ancient city of Aspendos was built on, and out of, the Belkis Conglomerate.

The youngest unit in the Aksu Basin is the Belkis Conglomerate, which only has visible outcroppings in the basin's southern part, in the Yenimahalle-Çalkaya sub-basin. These outcroppings consist of fluvial terraces along the Aksu River, fairly close to its present-day course. These terraces are marked by steep channels filled in with "redeposited terra rossa-type paleosols" (i.e. prehistoric soils). The ancient city of Aspendos was built on top of the Belkis Conglomerate, and its stone structures were originally quarried from here.

In composition, the Belkis Conglomerate is similar to the conglomerate portions of the Yenimahalle Formation. It is "highly heterogenous and composed mainly of clasts of Cretaceous limestone, serpentinite, and chert in a poorly sorted sandstone-siltstone matrix". The clasts are typically well-rounded and about 1-5 cm in size. They originally formed part of the Antalya Complex. Below the Belkis Conglomerate, an unconformity separates it from the Yenimahalle and Karpuzçay Formations.

The Belkis Conglomerate was formed during the middle Pleistocene, by "deposition in fluvial floodplains and channels along the ancestral Aksu River, together with regional uplift". The channels were formed by river incision and aggradation (soil deposition leading to increased elevation of land). They are now filled with prehistoric soils that were originally formed from the tufa formations and limestone basement rocks and redeposited here by the ancestral Aksu River during changes in its course, possibly during flash floods.

== Other features ==
=== Eskiköy canyon ===
The Eskiköy canyon, about 50 km north of Antalya, is from the pre-Pliocene. The canyon had its origins in a "faulted corridor" that the ancient Aksu River cut through. In the period preceding the Messinian salinity crisis, when sea levels felling, there was a period of erosion where the river "buried" the canyon. It is filled with "Early Pliocene fluvio-marine deposits".

=== Karadağ fan delta ===
Located on the west side of the central part of the basin, the Karadağ fan delta (also called the Karadağ Conglomerates) dates from the Serravallian and Tortonian periods and is composed of "sandstones and gravels of limestones and ophiolitic rocks". The sources of these deposits are the Bey Dağları platform carbonates and the Antalya Nappes; for example, there are Upper Cretaceous Globotruncata fossils present in the fan delta. The gravels are "medium to poorly sorted", typically range from 3 to 8 cm in size, and are embedded in a "granule/coarse sand matrix". The base of the Karadağ fan delta is not visible because of tectonic activity since its formation. The overall thickness of the fan delta is about 750 m.

=== Kargı fan delta ===
The Kargı fan delta is located on the Aksu Basin's western side. It is composed of "NE-dipping thick conglomerates intercalated with thin mudstones with a total thickness of 185 m". Semi-rounded pebbles of limestone and ophiolite, generally ranging between 3 and 5 cm in size, are embedded in a "granule/coarse sandy matrix". Deposits in the Kargı fan delta contain "isolated piles of patch reefs" dating from the Tortonian period, primarily consisting of "columnar-shaped, thick-bedded, vertically growing Porites lobatosepta and Tarbellastraea siliciae colonies". In some places, there are "outsized blocks" of rock representing rock fall or rock slides, with the reef deposits underneath getting crushed in the process.

Like the Karadağ fan delta, the Kargı fan delta was fed by the Bey Dağlari platform carbonates and the Antalya Nappes. Its growth mainly occurred in a north-northeast direction.

According to Üner et al., the Kargı fan delta was probably formed as a "shallow braided stream and overbank deposit that developed on a medial alluvial fan". They write that, based on the "upper succession with patch reefs", the cause of the fan delta's formation was "a sharp transgression over the alluvial fan".

Among foraminifera species in the Kargı area: planktic ones like Neogloboquadrina pachyderma, Globigerinoides tenellus, Globigerinoides obliquus obliquus, and Globoturborotalita rubescens; as well as the benthic ones Bulimina marginata and Saidovina karreriana.

=== Other fan deltas ===
The Kapıkaya, Kozan, and Bucak fan deltas were all deposited approximately during the Langhian through Messinian periods. The Kapıkaya fan delta was fed from the northern end of the Aksu Basin; the Kozan was fed from the east side; and the Bucak was fed from the west side (like the Karadağ and Kargı ones).

=== Çalkaya and Yeşilkaraman tuff deposits ===
A "homogenous" tuff deposit, c. 10m thick, exists near Çalkaya village. There are "ubiquitous" pumice clasts, which in some place form "channel-fill deposits". The Çalkaya tuff is interpreted as a shallow depositional ring formed by "a small, shallow phreatomagmatic eruption", only a few hundred meters across. No evidence of the actual eruption site has been found.

Further north, around Yeşilkaraman, there are traces of "a channel filled with tuffaceous material and pumice pebbles" that cuts down into a sandy soil layer; the pumice is similar to that at Çalkaya. Glover and Robertson interpreted the Yeşilkaraman deposit as "reworking of a similar tuff-ring into a clastic channel, together with other sediment".
