= Rhoscopus =

Coastal town of ancient Pamphylia

Coordinates: 36°51′37″N 30°51′16″E

Rhoscopus or Rhoskopous (Ancient Greek: Ῥοσκόπους), or Rhuscopus or Rhouskopous (Ῥουσκόπους), also known as Rhixoupous, was a coastal town of ancient Pamphylia near the mouth of the Cestrus River, inhabited during Roman times.

Its site is located east of Magydus, in Asiatic Turkey.
