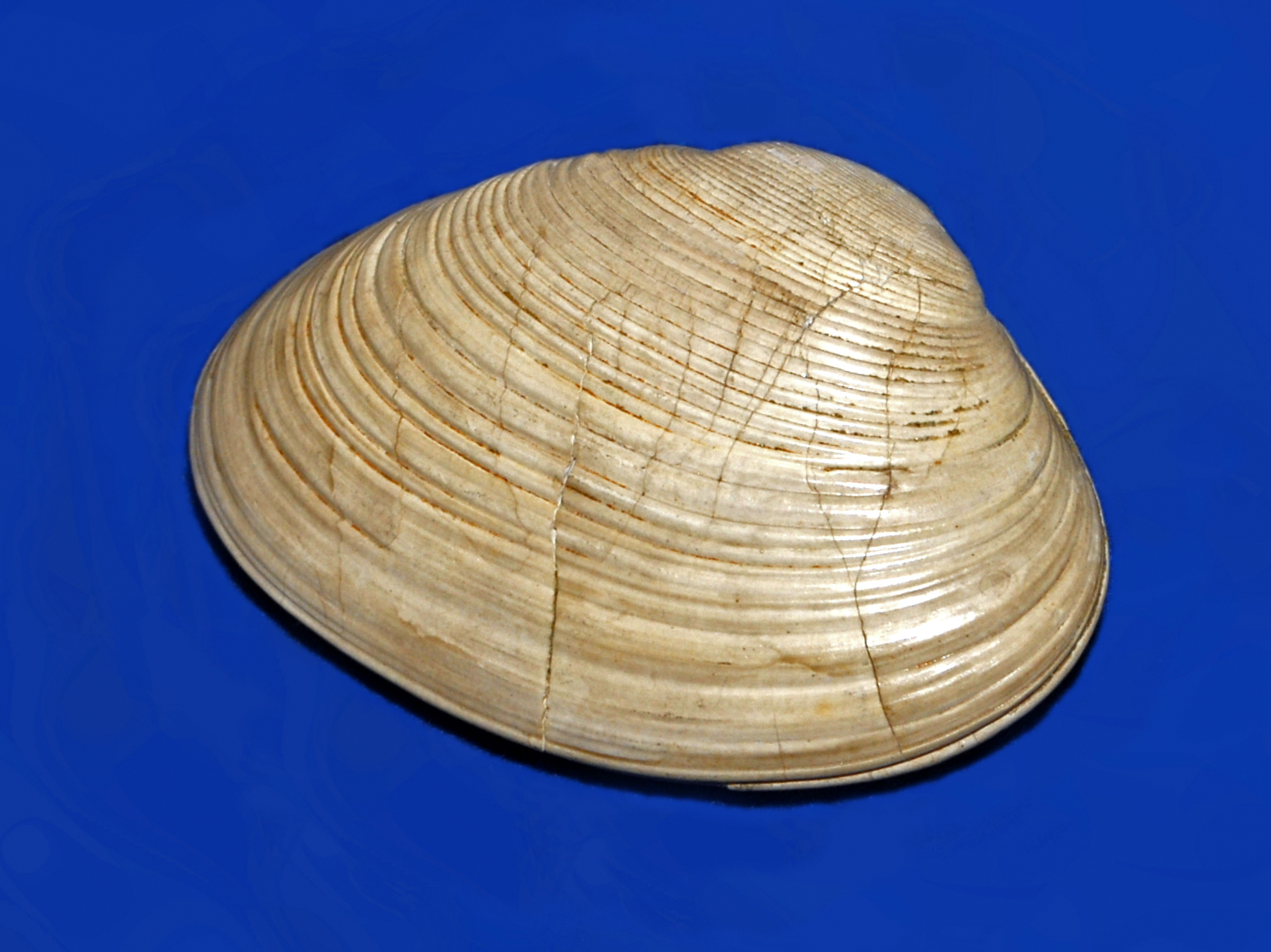
- Fossil valve of Paphia vetula from Pliocene of Italy

Scientific classification
- Kingdom: Animalia
- Phylum: Mollusca
- Class: Bivalvia
- Order: Venerida
- Family: Veneridae
- Genus: Paphia; Röding, 1798

Species
- See text

= Paphia (bivalve) =

Paphia Temporal range: Cretaceous – Present

Genus of bivalves

Paphia is a genus of saltwater clam, a marine bivalve mollusk in the subfamily Tapetinae of the family Veneridae, the Venus clams.

This genus is known in the fossil records from the Cretaceous to the Quaternary (age range: from 112.6 to 0.0 million years ago).

== Species ==
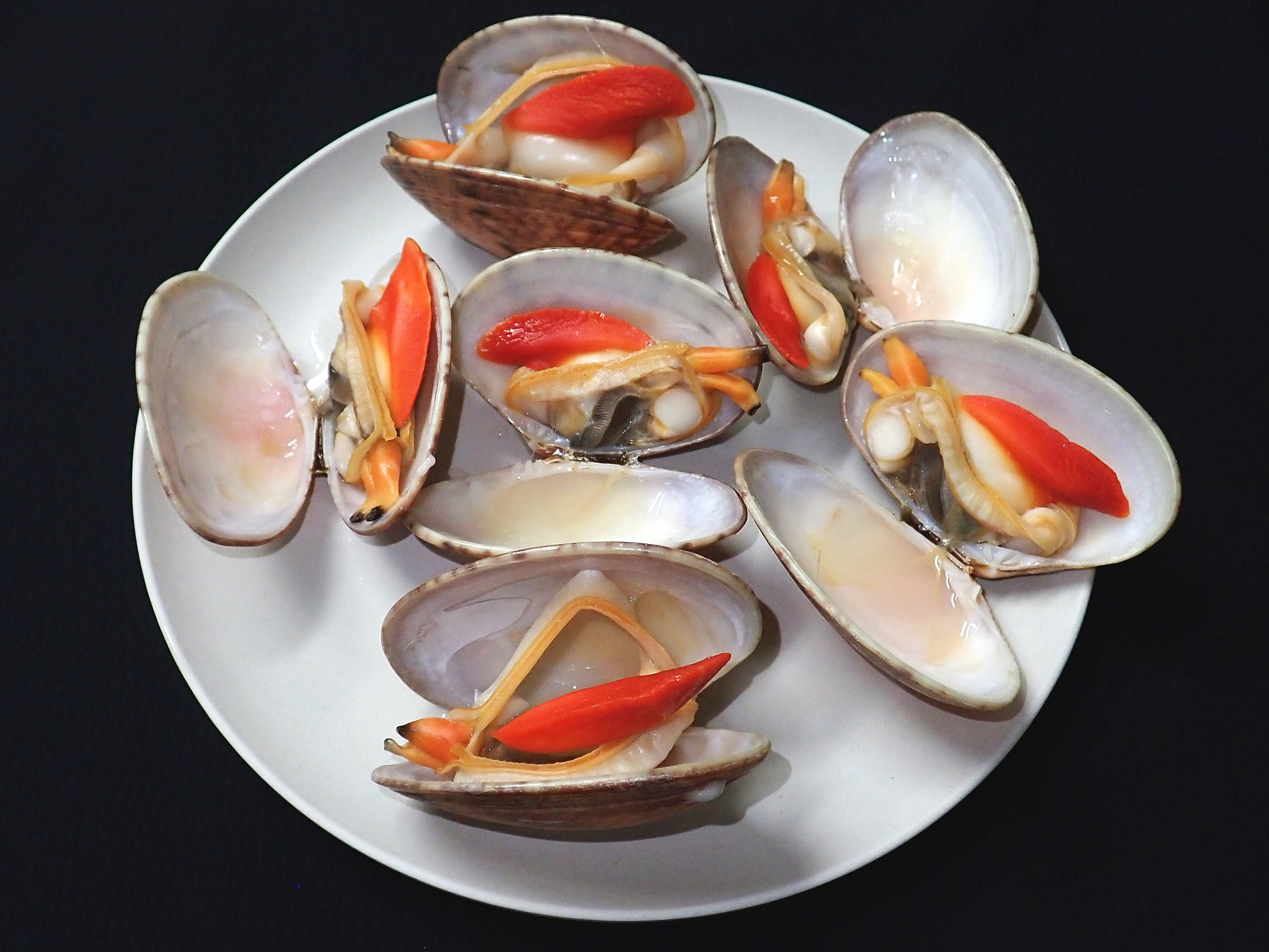
Cooked Paphia vernicosa in Japan

Species within this genus include:

- Paphia amabilis (Philippi, 1847)
- Paphia crassisulca (Lamarck, 1818)
- Paphia declivis (G. B. Sowerby II, 1852)
- Paphia euglypta (Philippi, 1847)
- †Paphia finlayi Marwick, 1927
- Paphia inflata (Deshayes, 1854)
- †Paphia japonica (Ando, 1953)
- Paphia kreipli M. Huber, 2010
- Paphia lirata (Philippi, 1848)
- Paphia lutaenkoi Thach, 2018
- Paphia philippiana M. Huber, 2010
- Paphia polita (G. B. Sowerby II, 1852)
- Paphia rotundata (Linnaeus, 1758)
- Paphia schnelliana (Dunker, 1865)
- Paphia semirugata (Philippi, 1847)
- Paphia sulcosa (Philippi, 1847)
- Paphia vernicosa (Gould, 1861)
- †Paphia vetula (Basterot, 1825)

=== Formerly included ===
- Paphia textile (Gmelin, 1791) has been designated a synonym of Paratapes textilis (Gmelin, 1791).
- Paphia undulata (Born, 1778) has been designated a synonym of Paratapes undulatus (Born, 1778).
