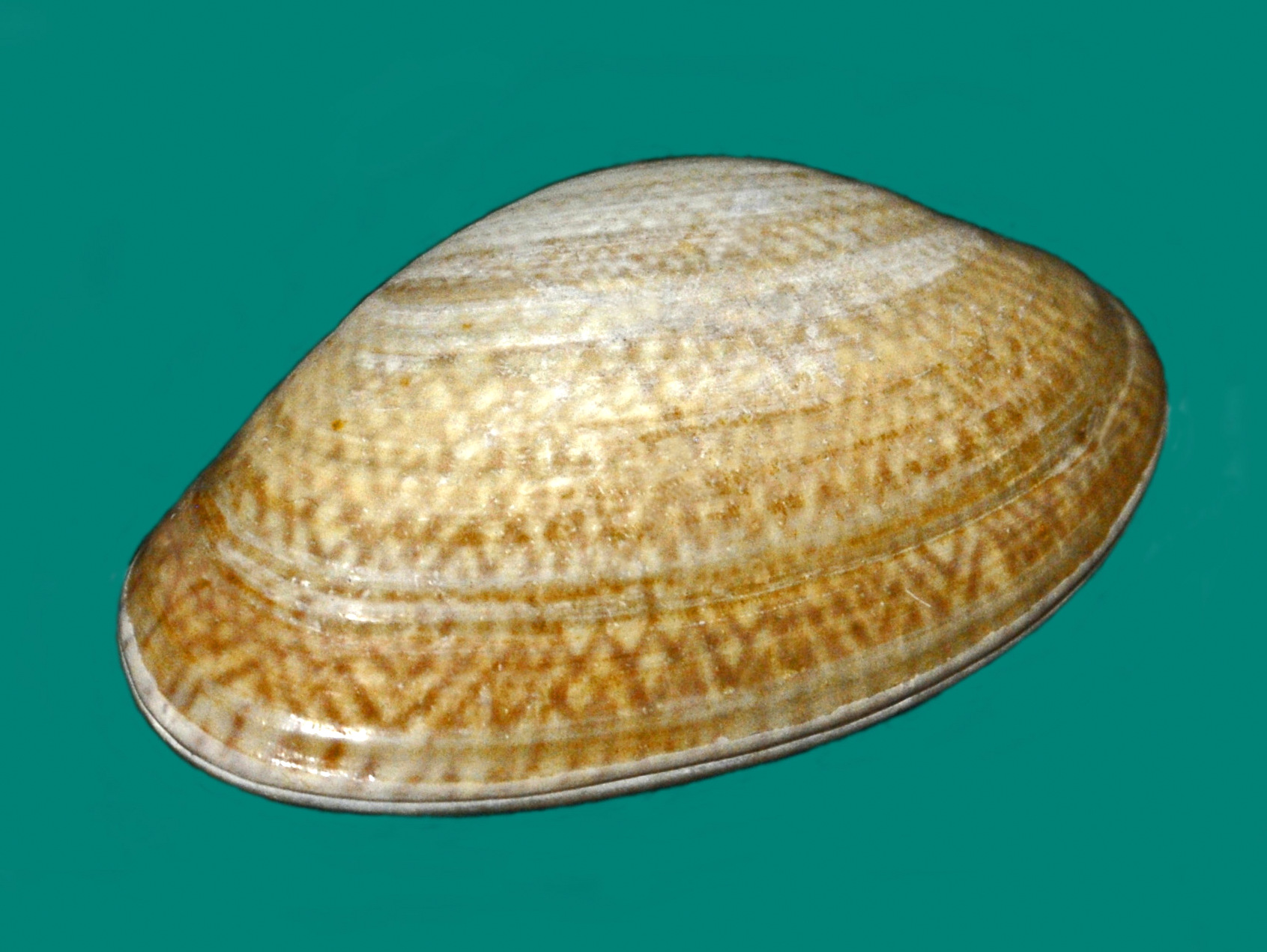
- Paratapes undulatus

Scientific classification
- Domain: Eukaryota
- Kingdom: Animalia
- Phylum: Mollusca
- Class: Bivalvia
- Order: Venerida
- Family: Veneridae
- Genus: Paratapes; Stoliczka, 1870

Species
- See text

= Paratapes =

Genus of bivalves

Paratapes is a genus of saltwater clam, a marine bivalve mollusk in the family Veneridae, the Venus clams.

== Species ==
- Paratapes textilis (Gmelin, 1791)
- Paratapes undulatus (Born, 1778)
