= Isparta Angle =

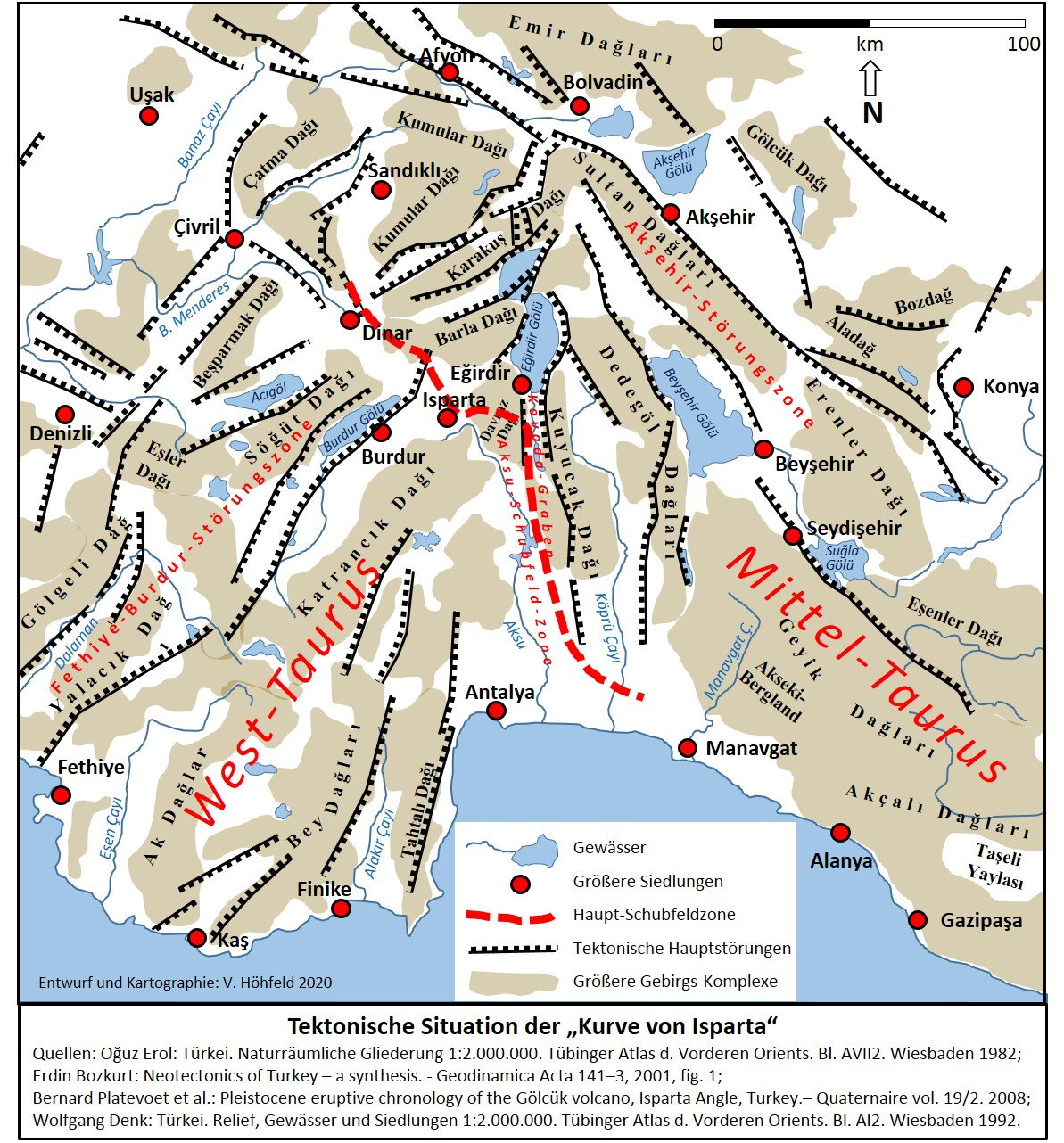
Map of the Isparta Angle (in German)

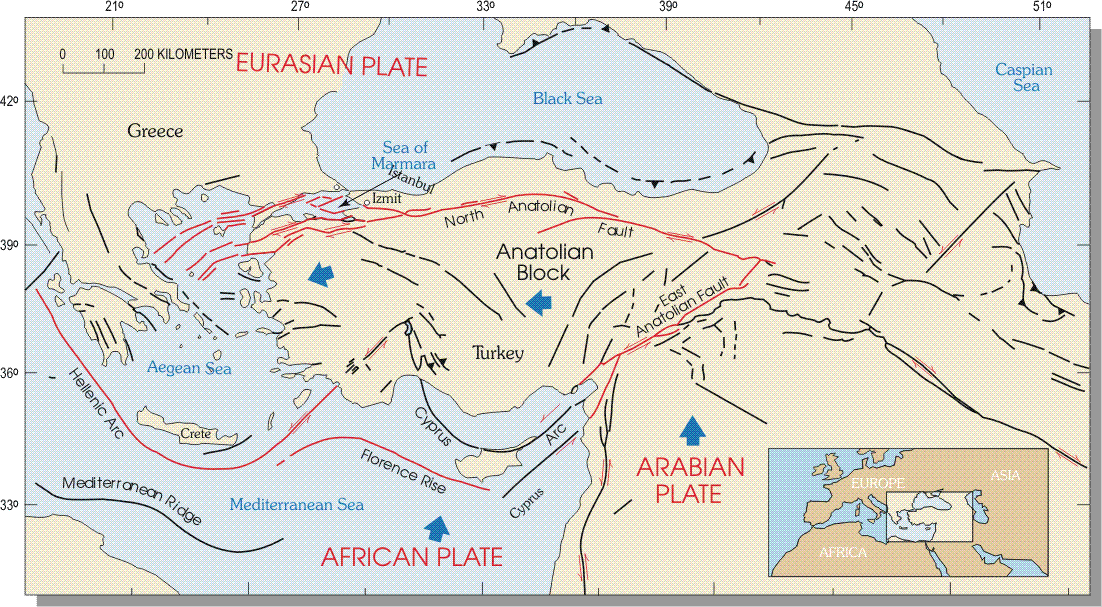
Tectonic map of Turkey, showing the Isparta Angle in the southwest

The Isparta Angle is an inverse-V-shaped morphotectonic structure located in southwestern Anatolia, to the north of the Gulf of Antalya. Formed by the intersection of the Aegean and Cyprian tectonic arcs, and located between the continental Bey Dağları and Anatolian blocks, the Isparta Angle is a geologically complex area with many nappes of diverse ages and origins that were pushed onto the Menderes-Tauride platform. The Isparta Angle is a result of the Anatolian Plate's rotation from the early Paleocene to the early Pliocene. This is a very seismically active area. It is "characterized by a series of grabens and horsts" separated by active faults.

Several sediment basins formed in the Isparta Angle during Oligocene and Neogene times as a result of episodic closures of the Neo-Tethys. From west to east on the south side, these include the Kasaba-Korkuteli Basin (on the western edge of the Isparta Angle), the Aksu Basin and Köprüçay Basin (both in the angle's "southern core"), and the Manavgat Basin (located on the eastern edge). Of these, the Aksu, Köprüçay, and Manavgat Basins together make up the Antalya Basin.

On the north side, the basins include the axial Tauride molasse basin as well as the Çameli, Acıpayam, Karamanlı, Burdur, Isparta, Senirkent, Dinar, Dombayova–Sandıklı, Karadirek, Sinanpaşa, Haydarlı–Karaadilli, the Gelendost, the Beyşehir–Yarıkkaya, the Şuhut, and the Akşehir–Afyon basins. Other features in the "northern core" of the Isparta Angle include the Yalvaç, Gelendost, and Eğirdir–Kovada grabens.
