= Yalvaç Basin =

The Yalvaç Basin is a sedimentary basin in Turkey, around Lake Beyşehir and the present-day town of Yalvaç. It lies within the geological region known as the Isparta Angle. It has existed since Miocene times.

== General description ==
The Yalvaç Basin is a sedimentary basin located in the northern tip of the Isparta Angle. It generally runs from northwest to southeast and is about 55 km long and 15 km wide. Lake Beyşehir occupies its southern part, while at its northwestern end is the village of Yarıkkaya. To the north, east, and west, the Yalvaç Basin is bounded by mountains, such as the Sultandağları mountains.

The Yalvaç Basin's shape and size have been mostly the same since its formation, either during or shortly before the Middle Miocene, and sedimentary deposition has been occurring here since then.

== Stratigraphy ==
The Yalvaç Basin consists of four main geological formations, from oldest to youngest: the Bağkonak Formation, the Yarıkkaya Formation, the Göksöğüt Formation, and the Kırkbaş Formation. Their total thickness is about 800 m. Below these are basement rocks of diverse origin including ophiolites, metamorphic rocks from the Afyon zone, and non-metamorphic rocks that originally came from the Tauride fold and thrust belt and were thrust here in Cretaceous through Eocene times.

- The Bağkonak Formation, the oldest formation in the basin, unconformably overlies pre-Neogene basement rocks. It is especially well exposed south of Yalvaç, near Özbayat and Bağkonak. It is about 250 m thick and mostly consists of "continental red clastics with dominantly conglomerates at the bottom and intercalating sandstone and sandy-mudstone towards the upper levels". It was probably formed by sedimentary deposits in river deltas and alluvial fans along the border between the Yalvaç Basin and the Sultandağları mountains. No fossils have been found in the Bağkonak Formation.
- The Yarıkkaya Formation unconformably overlies the pre-Neogene basement rocks in the north and conformably overlies the Bağkonak Formation in the south. Its composition ranges from "coarse, sub-rounded, poorly sorted, grain-supported conglomerate" at the bottom to sandstone in the middle to coarser conglomerate at the top. The lower parts were likely formed as river deposits; towards the central part of the basin, "fine mud/clay, marly limestone, and tufa deposits" represent shallow lake deposits. Lignite seams represent deposition from swamp environments. Fossils include freshwater gastropod species like Planorbis and Limnea found in mudstone and claystone deposits, and vertebrates like rodents and hamsters found in upper levels deposited from lake environments. Various ages have been estimated for this formation; Yağmurlu suggested a Middle Miocene date based on the gastropod fossils, while Saraç proposed an Early-Middle Miocene date based on the vertebrate fossils.
- The Göksöğüt Formation overlies the Yarıkkaya Formation, unconformably in the north and conformably in the south. At the bottom, it consists of "banded, highly porous brownish limestone", and further upward it coarsens into conglomerate. The overall formation is at least 150 m thick. It is especially exposed around Ayvalı and north of Körküler. The coarsening of deposits from bottom to top is interpreted by Koç et al. as sedimentary infilling of a lake basin by "high-energy" river systems. Fossils of the gastropods Planorbis and Limnea have been found in the marl and claystone levels of the Göksöğüt Formation, although Yağmurlu said these were "endemic" and cautioned against using them to date the formation.
- The Kırkbaş Formation unconformably overlies the Göksöğüt Formation and mainly consists of "reddish, poorly consolidated conglomerate, sandstone, and mudstone alternations". It is itself overlain by Quaternary alluvial deposits. It is especially visible around Kırkbaş and east of Terziler. Around Tokmacık, Hipparion and Mastodon fossils have been found, indicating that the Kırkbaş Formation dates to the Pliocene period.

== Faults ==
The edges of the Yalvaç Basin are marked by various large-scale normal faults. Within the basin, there are many medium-sized faults with displacements of a few centimeters to a few meters. The primary fault directions are northwest–southeast and northeast–southwest, indicating that the local tectonics are controlled by two main "zones of weakness".

The most prominent fault zone in the area is the Yarıkkaya Fault Zone. It runs west toward the Karacaören Fault and east toward the Sultandağları mountains, where it dies out. Another zone is the Çakırçal Fault Zone, which goes northwest–southeast for over 15 km and is itself interrupted by the eastern part of the Yarıkkaya Fault Zone. Then there is the Sağır Fault Zone, which forms an 18 km-long valley running northwest–southeast west of Sağır. It is also cut up by the Yarıkkaya Fault Zone, as well as by the northeast–southwest-trending Kumdanlı Fault Zone. The Kumdanlı Fault Zone itself runs for about 20 km, from Mısırlı in the northeast to south of Aşağıtırtar in the southwest before disappearing into Lake Hoyran. Its northeastern end disappears into the Yalvaç Basin's sedimentary infill. Another fault zone is the northeast-southwest Yaka Fault zone, which is about 6 km wide and over 20 km long. It runs from south of Gelendost at its southwestern end to near Madenli in the northeast. The Yaka Fault Zone controls the southern margin of the Yalvaç Basin and separates the Yarıkkaya Formation from the underlying basement rocks.
