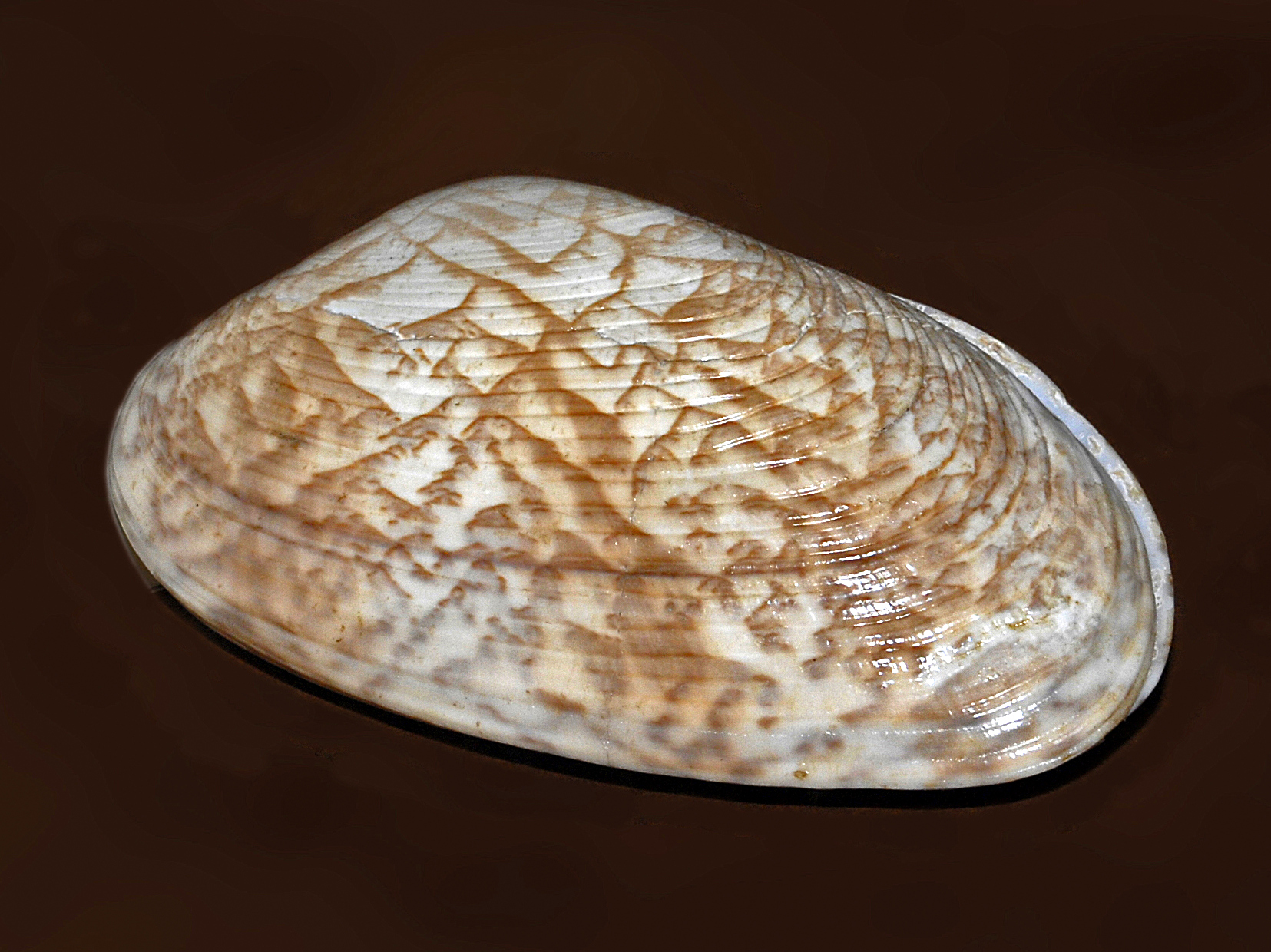
- Valve of Paratapes textilis from Indian Ocean

Scientific classification
- Kingdom: Animalia
- Phylum: Mollusca
- Class: Bivalvia
- Order: Venerida
- Superfamily: Veneroidea
- Family: Veneridae
- Genus: Paratapes
- Species: P. textilis

Binomial name
- Paratapes textilis (Gmelin, 1791)

Synonyms
- Paphia textile

= Paratapes textilis =

Species of bivalve

Paratapes textilis is a species of saltwater clam, a marine bivalve mollusk in the family Veneridae, the Venus clams.

== Description ==
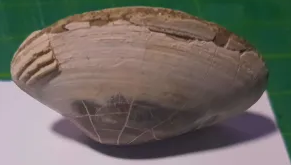
cf. Paratapes textilis from the Pliocene of Java, Indonesia

Shell of Paratapes textilis can reach a length of 3–4 centimetres (1.2–1.6 in), with a maximum length of 8 centimetres (3.1 in). These shells are elongate, elliptical-ovate and moderately inflated, with rounded margins. The outer shell surface is smooth, glossy, pale yellowish-white, with pale purplish grey inverted V-shaped markings. Hinge is narrow, with three radiating cardinal teeth.

Right and left valve of the same specimen:

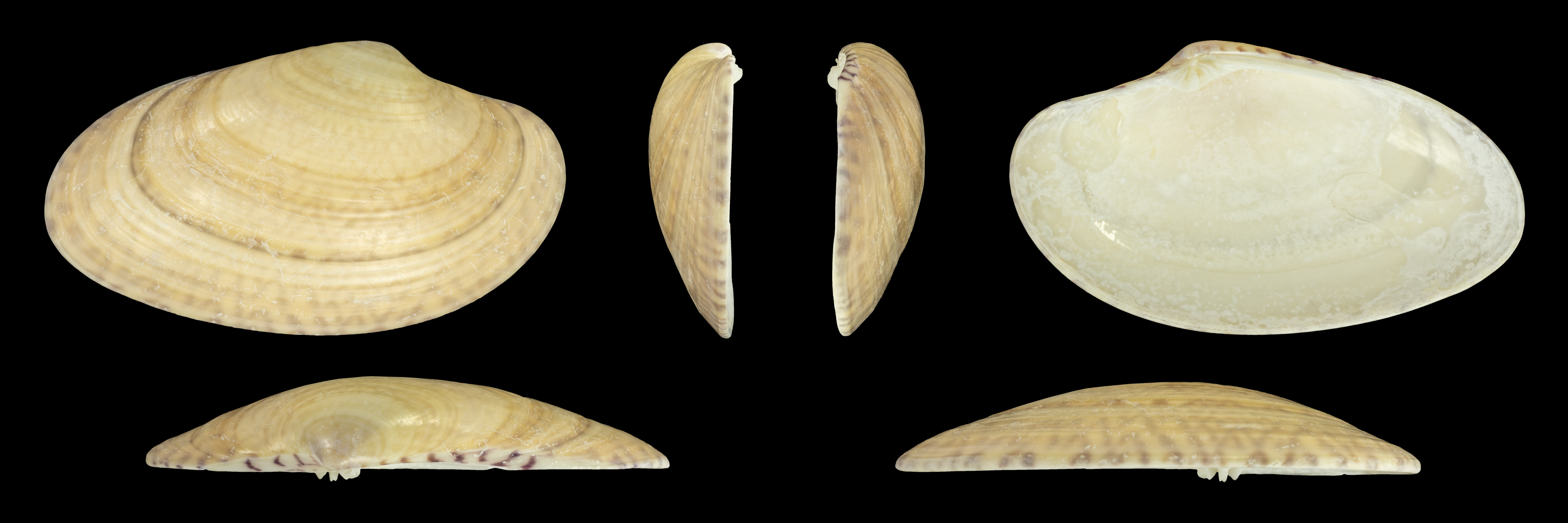
Right valve

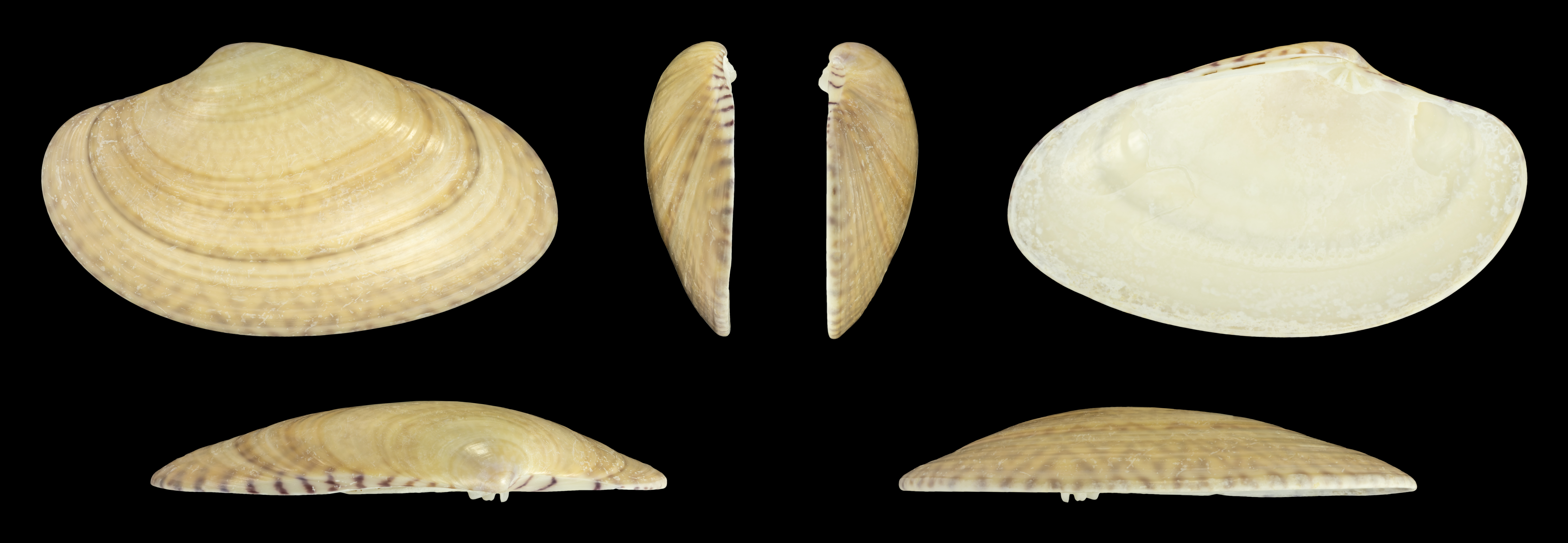
Left valve

== Distribution ==
This species is present in Indian Ocean and in South Africa.

== Habitat ==
These bivalves live on sandy bottoms or attached to rocks, at depths of up to 4 metres.
