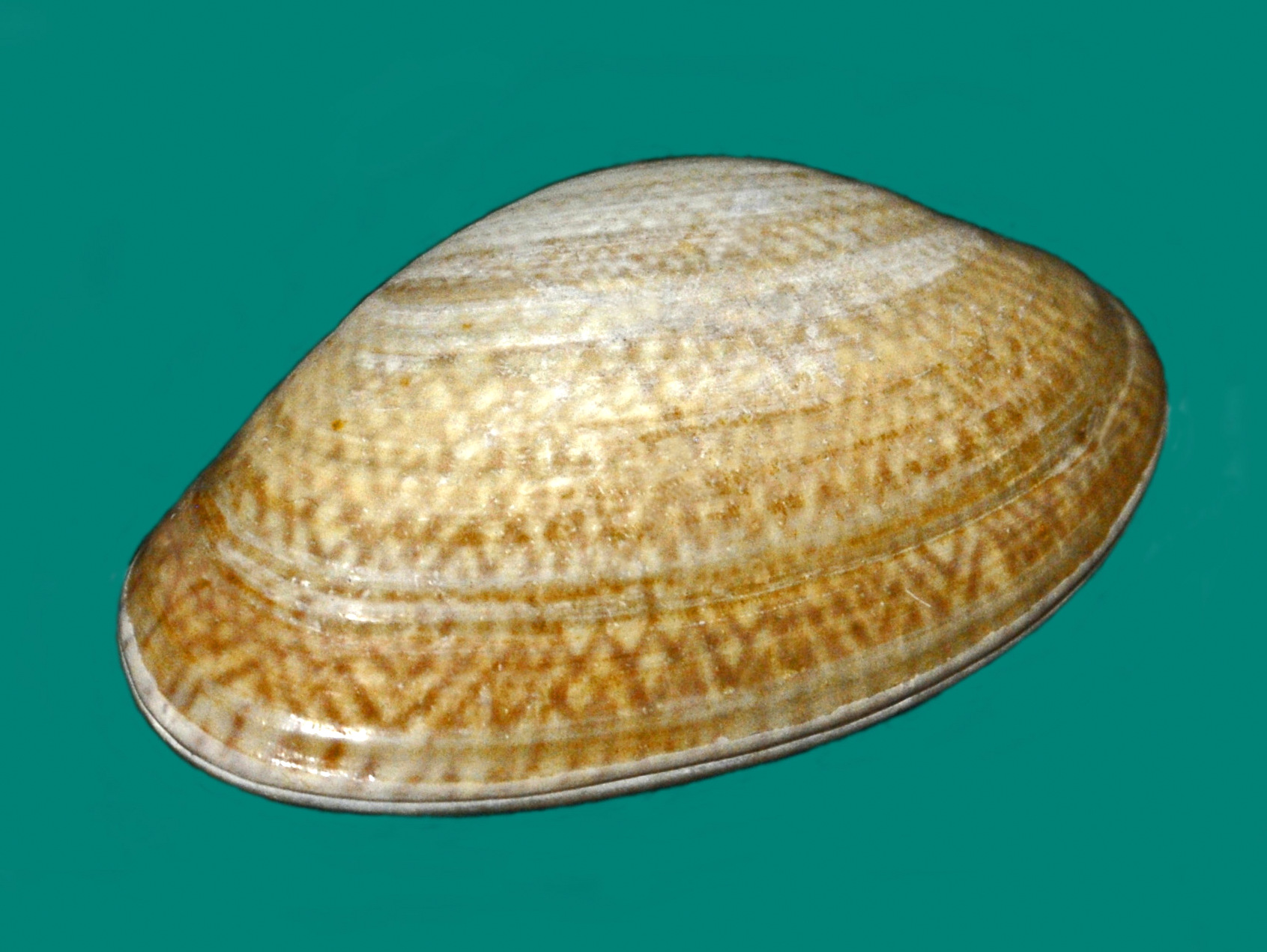
- A view of a valve of Paratapes undulatus. Museum specimen

Scientific classification
- Kingdom: Animalia
- Phylum: Mollusca
- Class: Bivalvia
- Order: Venerida
- Family: Veneridae
- Genus: Paratapes
- Species: P. undulatus

Binomial name
- Paratapes undulatus Born, 1778

Synonyms
- Paphia undulata (Born, 1778); Paratapes scordalus Iredale, 1936; Venus rimosa Philippi, 1847; Venus undulata Born, 1778

= Paratapes undulatus =

Species of bivalve

Paratapes undulatus, common name undulate venus, is a species of saltwater clam, a marine bivalve mollusk in the family Veneridae, the Venus clams.

== Distribution and habitat ==
This species inhabits the inshore shallow sandy seabed in the Indo-West Pacific (Red Sea to Papua New Guinea; north to Japan and south to New South Wales).

== Description ==
Shells of Paratapes undulatus can reach a length of 6.5 centimetres (2.6 in).

Right and left valve of the same specimen:

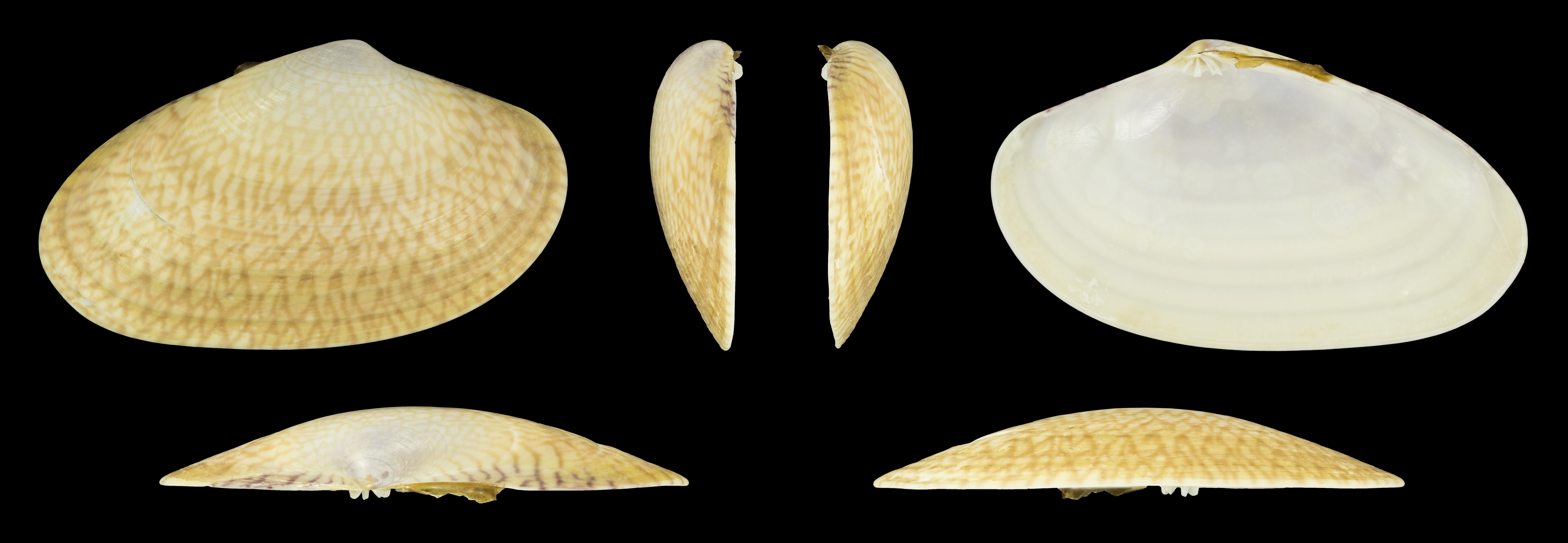
Right valve

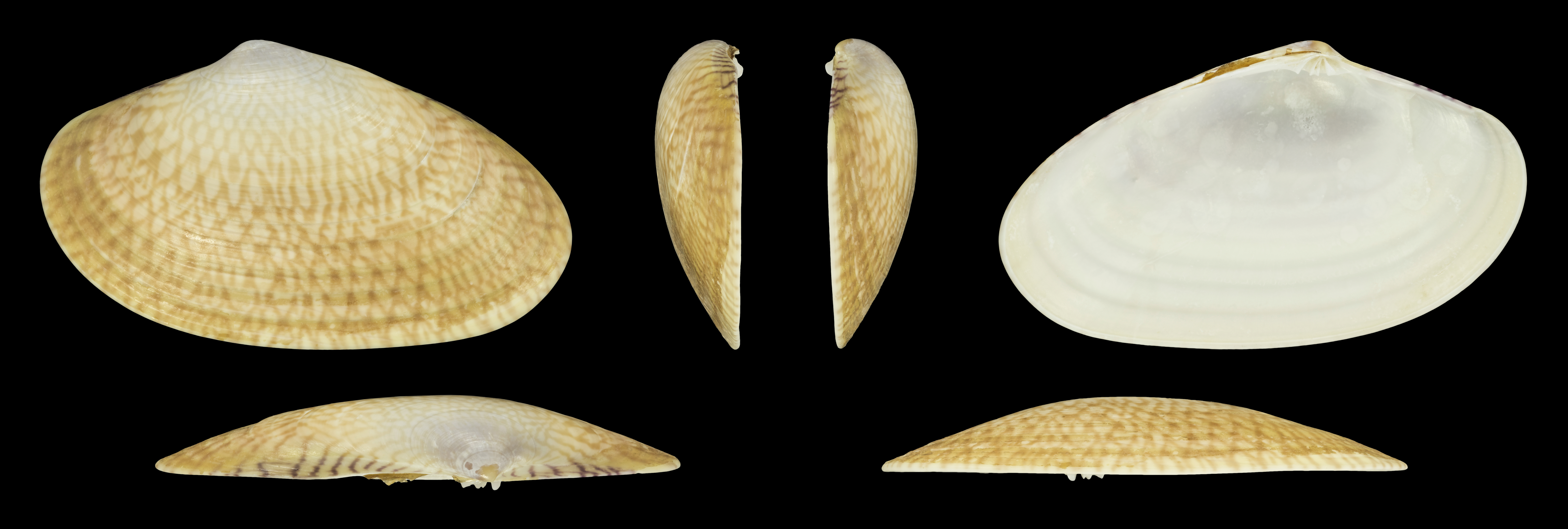
Left valve

== Human culture ==
These clams are a popular food in most Asian countries including China, the Philippines, Thailand and Vietnam.

== Gallery ==
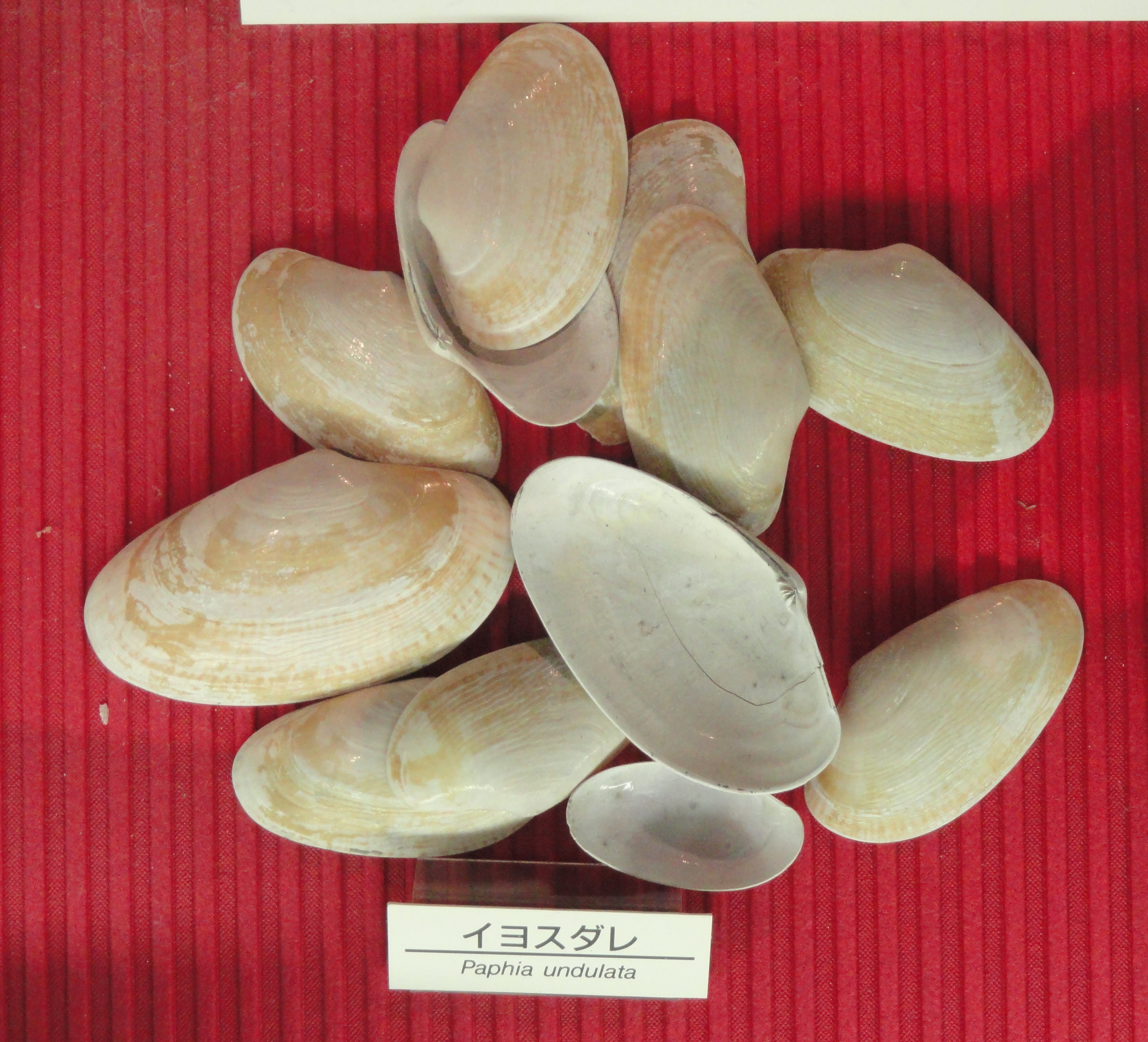
Paratapes undulatus, museum specimen

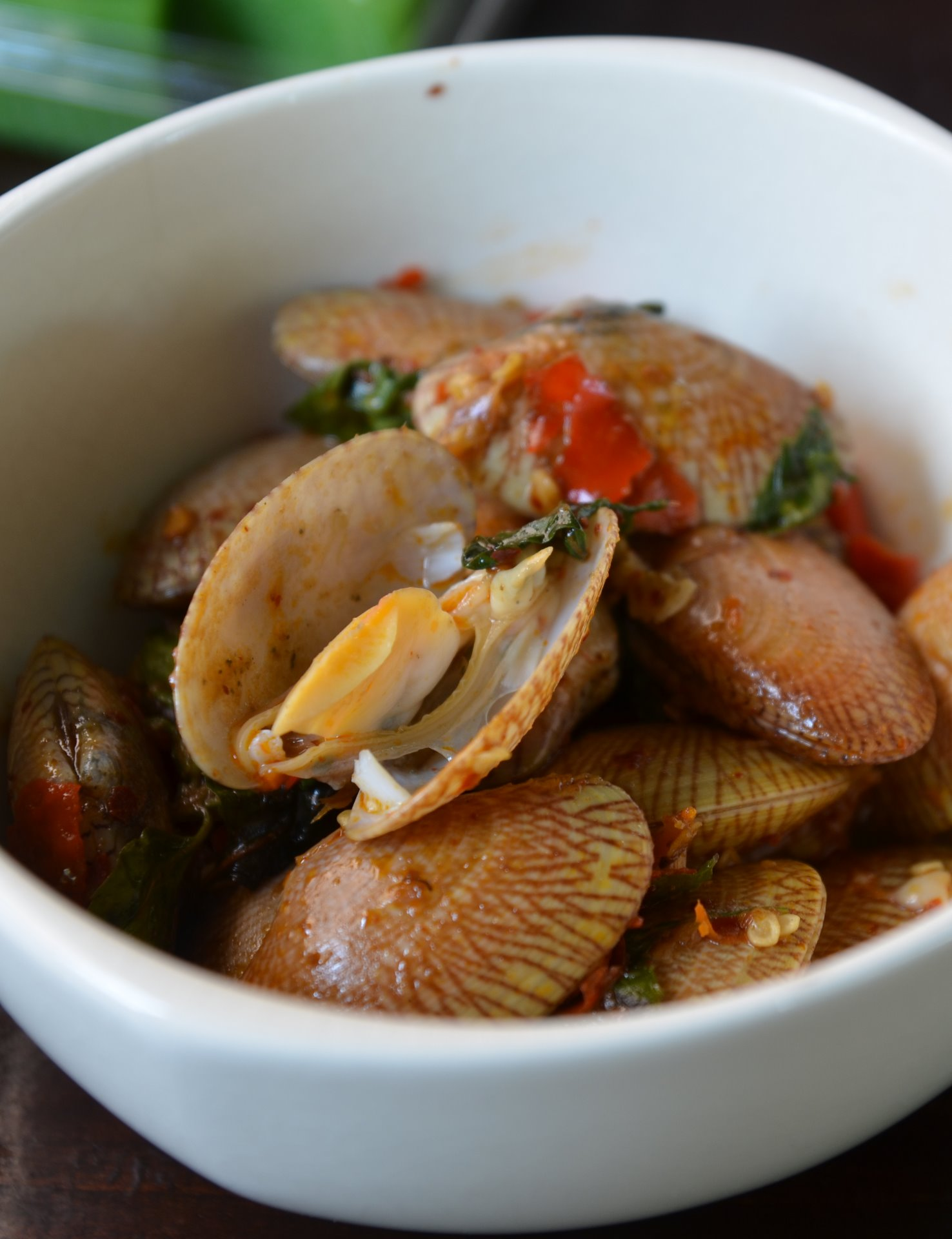
Paratapes undulatus used as food in Thailand
