= Aksu River (Turkey) =

River in Turkey

Coordinates: 36°51′13″N 30°55′13″E

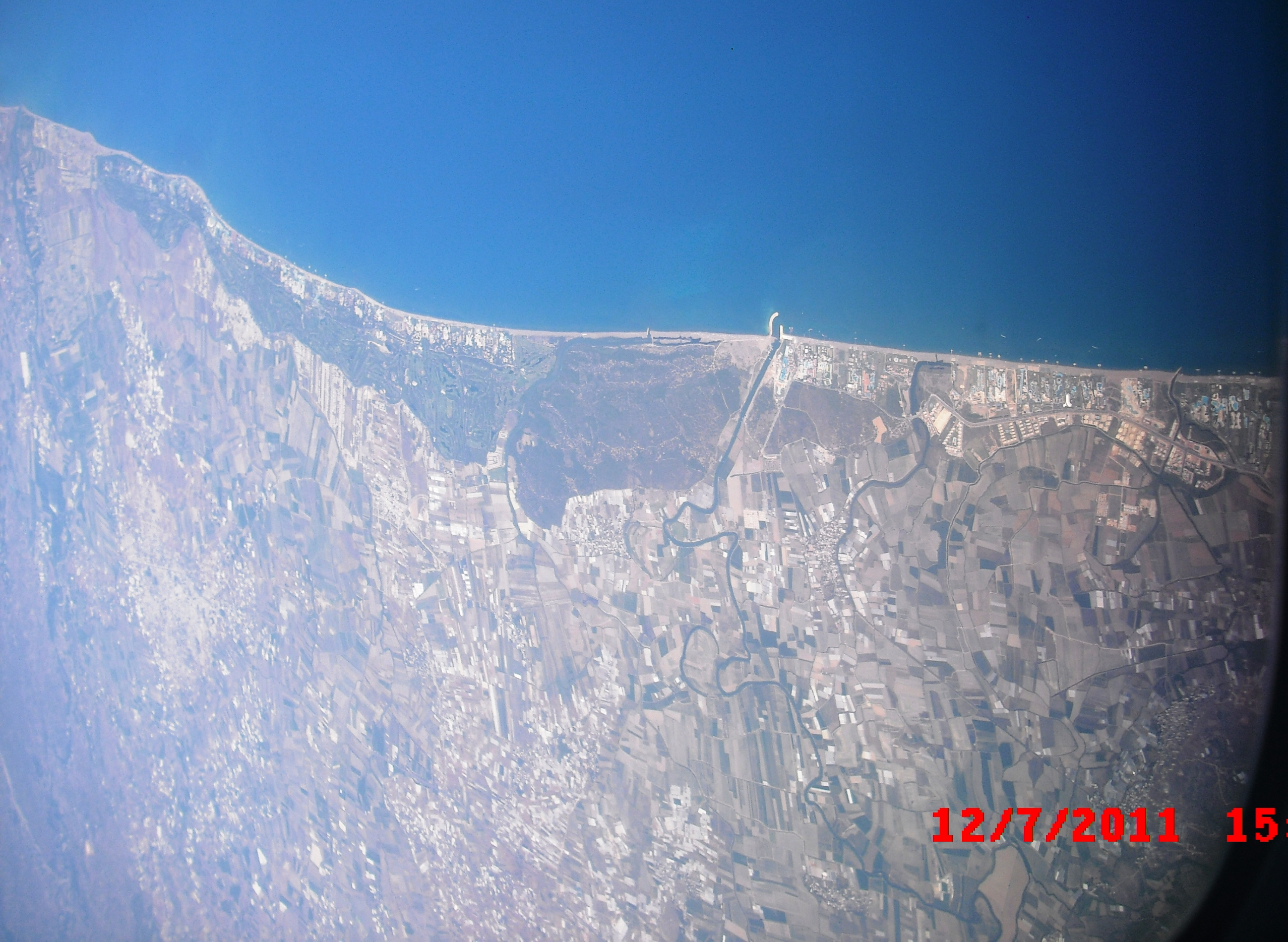
Aerial photo of the Aksu Çayı's delta, with up being south.

The Aksu (Bronze Age name in Hittite: 𒁉𒋻𒀀𒅀, Kaštaraya, ancient name in Greek Κέστρoς, Kestros), is a river in Antalya Province (southwestern Turkey), which rises in the mountains of Toros. The course of the Aksu is between the Düden to the west and of the Köprüçay to the east. It discharges into the Mediterranean near the city of Antalya. The river is about 145 km long and has a total catchment area of 3652 km^{2}. There are several lakes in its catchment area, including Lake Kovada and the reservoirs created by the Karacaören-1 and Karacaören-2 Dams.

The Aksu is primarily fed by karstic springs in the Taurus Mountains. In contrast to the many seasonal streams in the region, the Aksu flows year-round, although its volume can fluctuate dramatically throughout the year. For example, its flow was measured in 1942 to be 250 m^{3}/s in January and 7.5 m^{3}/s during the summer. Like other karstic streams, the Aksu does not carry much sediment with it.

In its lower reaches, the Aksu forms a soft, fertile alluvial plain, which contrasts sharply with both the hard travertine complex around Antalya to the west and the rocky Pleistocene terraces to the east. The Aksu's delta is wave-dominated, due to the river's low sediment load and strong coastal currents. These processes have turned some former river mouths into closed-off limans and created four distinct systems of dunes running parallel to the coast, reaching heights of up to 12 m. Some parts of the delta, particularly around river mouths, are swamps which were historically sources of malaria.

Today, the river is impacted by human activities. The Karacaören-1 dam was built to provide water for irrigation, produce electricity, and control flooding downstream. The Karacaören-2 dam was built to provide drinking water for residents of Antalya. The dams siphon off a lot of the Aksu's water to generate electricity, and intensive agriculture in the areas downstream also uses up a lot of the water. As a result, the lower Aksu carries much less water and may even run dry sometimes. The river is also impacted by pollution at several areas: the dam reservoirs are used for domestic and industrial wastewater discharge, and a water treatment plant also discharges into the Aksu.

== History ==
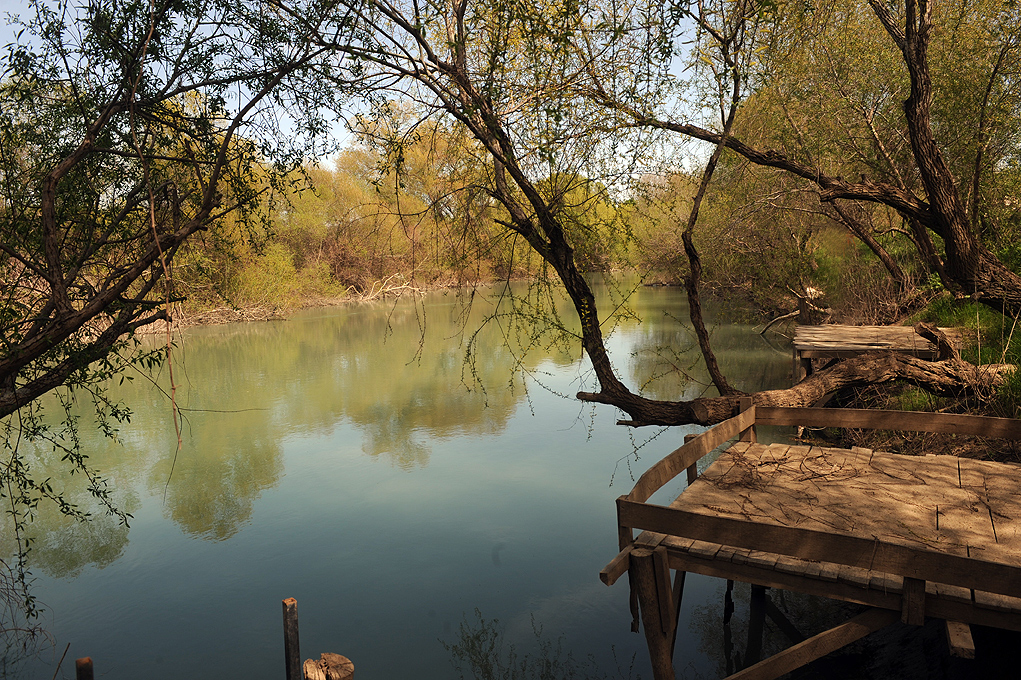
The Aksu near Boztepe, close to the river mouth

=== Late Bronze Age ===
In the 13th century BC, a treaty between the Hittite Great King Tudhaliya IV and his vassal, the king of Tarhuntassa, defined the latter's western border at the "Kastaraya River", near "Parha". Parha is likely the future Perga.

=== Classical Age ===
The permanent supply of water, and the resulting fertility of the surrounding plain, was a contributing factor to the prosperity of the ancient city of Perga.

As Kestros, the river is mentioned by Pomponius Mela as navigable, as far upriver as Perga, 60 stadia (about 11.1 kilometres (6.9 mi)) from its mouth, according to Strabo. It silted up over the Byzantine era, and Perga declined as a result.

== Today ==
From the 1854 Dictionary of Greek and Roman Geography, the Aksu is "300 feet (91 m) wide at its mouth, and 15 feet (4.6 m) deep within the bar, which extends across the mouth, and so shallow in places in its delta as to be impassable to boats that draw more than 1 foot (0.30 m) of water". The swell from the sea meeting the stream generally produces a violent surf."

At its headwaters is the Kovada Lake and just below that the Karacaören Dam reservoir.

== Fauna ==
A 2005 study found 17 different species of oligochaeta in various parts of the Aksu and its tributaries: Aulodrilus pluriseta, Aulodrilus pigueti, Potamothrix hammoniensis, Psammoryctides albicola, Tubifex tubifex, Limnodrilus ukedemianus, Chaetogaster diaphanus, Nais pardalis, Nais variabilis, Nais communis, Nais bretscheri, Dero digitata, Aulophorus furcatus, Pristinella osborni, Pristinella jenkinae, and Stylaria lacustris. Many of these species have a cosmopolitan distribution.

== Geology ==
Around the Aksu River is the Aksu Basin, a sedimentary basin that forms part of the broader Antalya Basin.

In front of the mouth of the Aksu River, there is a broad, shallow marine shelf offshore where the present-day sediments of the Aksu River are deposited. In the past, this area was deeper; according to Poisson et al, there was likely a canyon, as there still is over by the Düden and Karaman mouths near Antalya, but this canyon has since been filled in by Quaternary deposition from the Aksu River.

Poisson et al reconstructed the course of the Aksu River around the end of the Messinian period (c. 5.3 MYA) this way: the river flowed through the Eskiköy Canyon, then "crossed the Antalya alluvial plain before joining the Antalya abyssal plain, through the actively cutting Antalya canyon".

During the Quaternary period, the Aksu River cut a new gorge – not in the same place as the Eskiköy canyon; the river's course had changed in the meantime. During the middle Pleistocene, "deposition in fluvial floodplains and channels along the ancestral Aksu River" created fluvial terraces known as the Belkis Conglomerate.
